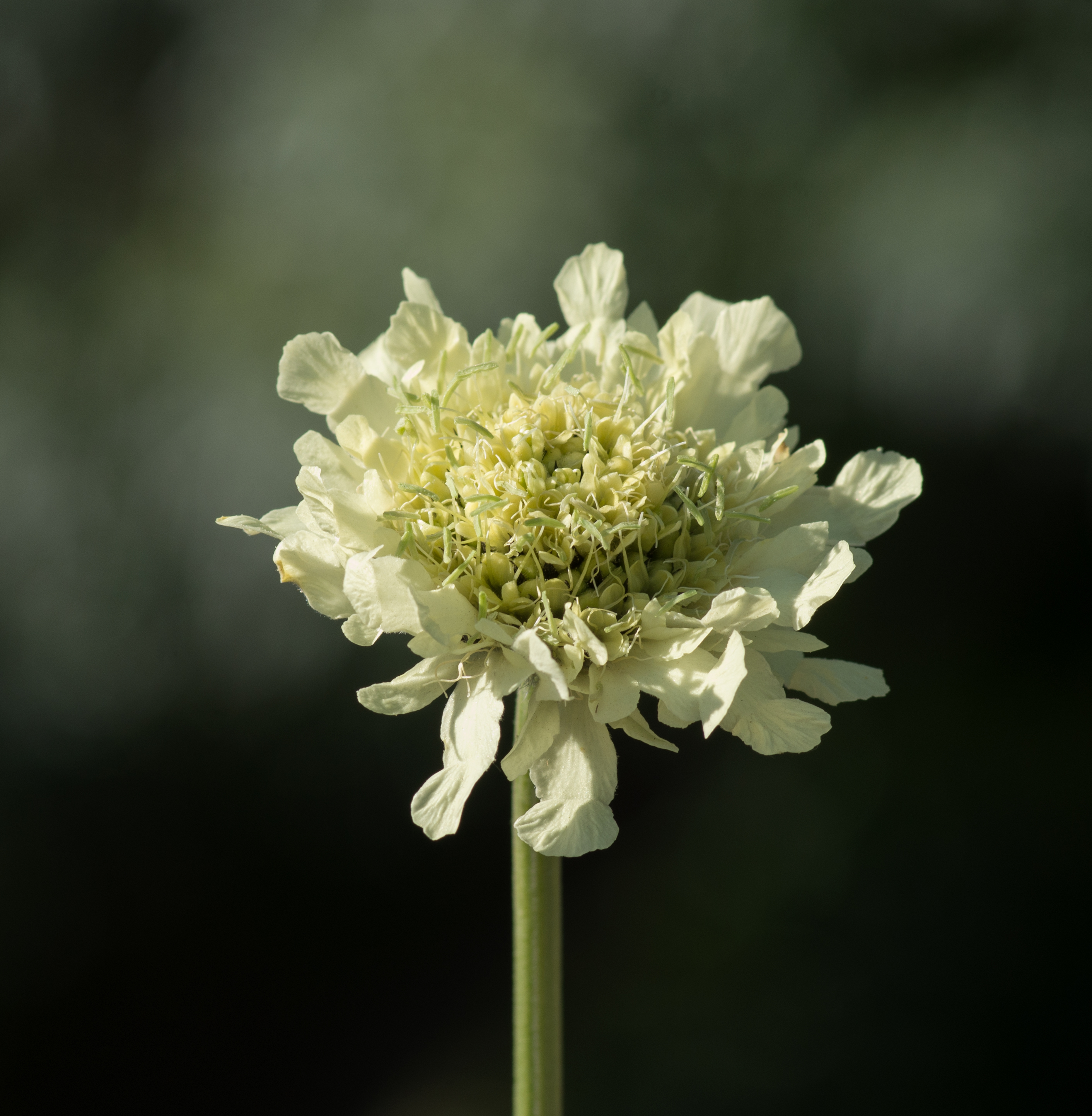
- Cephalaria alpina
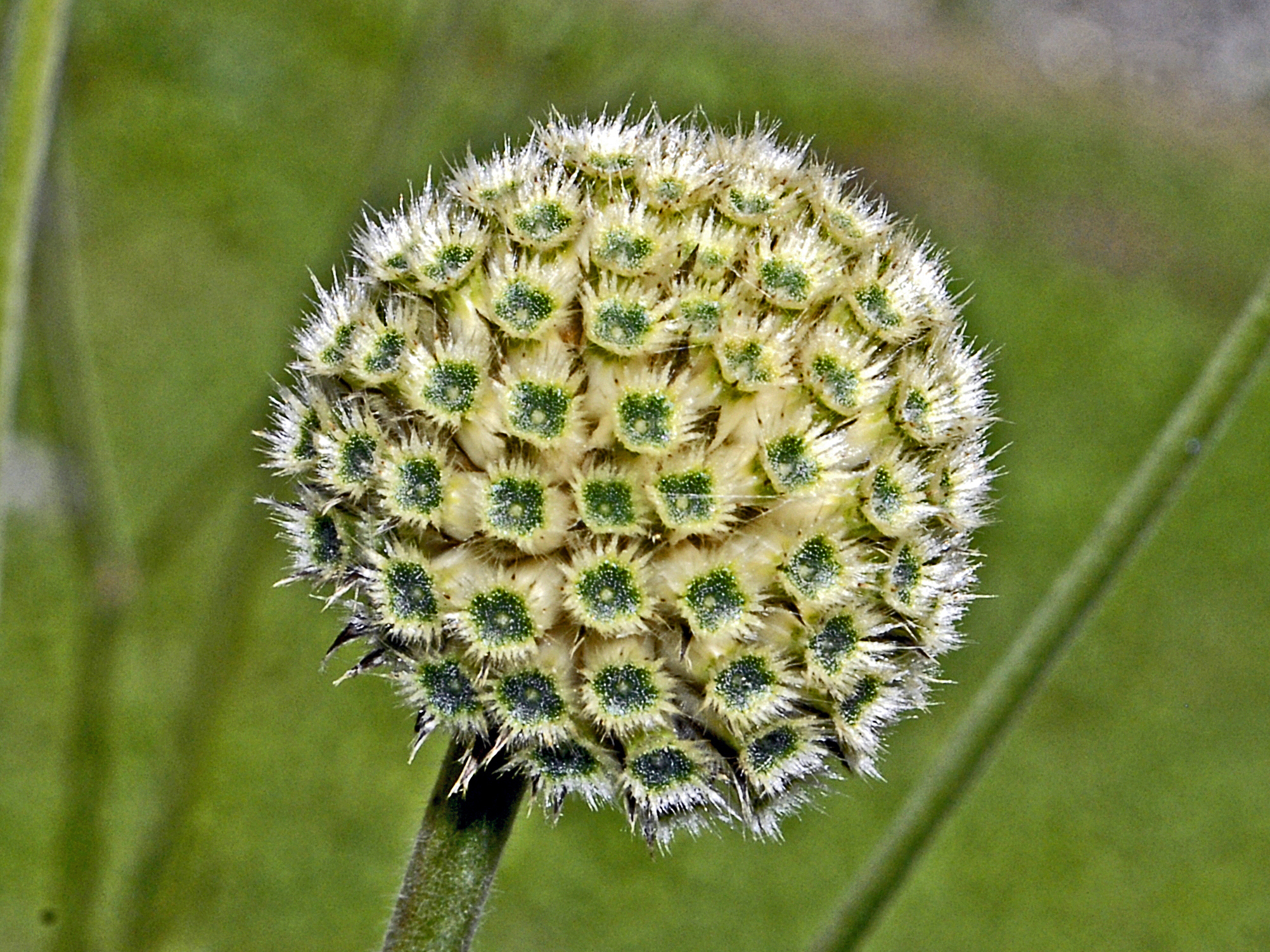
- Inflorescence of Cephalaria alpina at the Paradisia Alpine Botanical Garden

Scientific classification
- Kingdom: Plantae
- Clade: Embryophytes
- Clade: Tracheophytes
- Clade: Angiosperms
- Clade: Eudicots
- Clade: Asterids
- Order: Dipsacales
- Family: Caprifoliaceae
- Genus: Cephalaria
- Species: C. alpina

Binomial name
- Cephalaria alpina (L.) Roem. & Schult.

Synonyms
- Cephalaria laevigata Pančić ex Nyman nom. illeg.; Cephalaria procera Pančić ex Nyman; Cephalaria rupestris Griseb. ex Nyman; Cerionanthus alpinus Schott ex Roem. & Schult.; Scabiosa alpina L.

= Cephalaria alpina =

Species of flowering plant in the honeysuckle family

Cephalaria alpina, commonly known as the yellow cephalaria, alpine scabious or yellow scabious, is a species of flowering plant in the family Caprifoliaceae native to the Alps in Europe.

== Description ==
Cephalaria alpina is a branched, perennial herbaceous plant growing to 60–100 centimetres (24–39 in) in height. The long stem is hairy, leaves are 9–12 millimetres (0.35–0.47 in) long and 2–3 millimetres (0.079–0.118 in) wide, petiolate, dentate and densely hairy on the underside. This plant shows pale yellow head-like inflorescences on the naked stems. The flowering period extends from June to August.

== Distribution and habitat ==
This species is present in Western and Eastern Alps, in the northern Apennines and in the Swiss Jura. It prefers nutrient-rich and limestone soils at an elevation of 1,000–1,500 metres (3,300–4,900 ft) above sea level.

It has been declared a weed in Australia.

== Ecology ==
The flowers are visited by the white-tailed bumblebee (Bombus lucorum) and Bombus cryptarum.

== Bibliography ==
- Gunter Steinbach (Hrsg.): Alpenblumen (Steinbachs Naturführer). Mosaik Verlag GmbH, München 1996, ISBN 3-576-10558-1.
- Pignatti S. 1982 -Flora d'Italia. Bologna
- Zangheri P. 1976- Flora Italica. Padova
- Aeschimann D., Lauber K., Moser D.M., Theurillat J.P., 2004 - Flora Alpina. Bologna
- Conti F., Abbate G., Alessandrini A., Blasi C., 2005 -An Annoted Checklist of the Italian Vascular Flora. Roma
