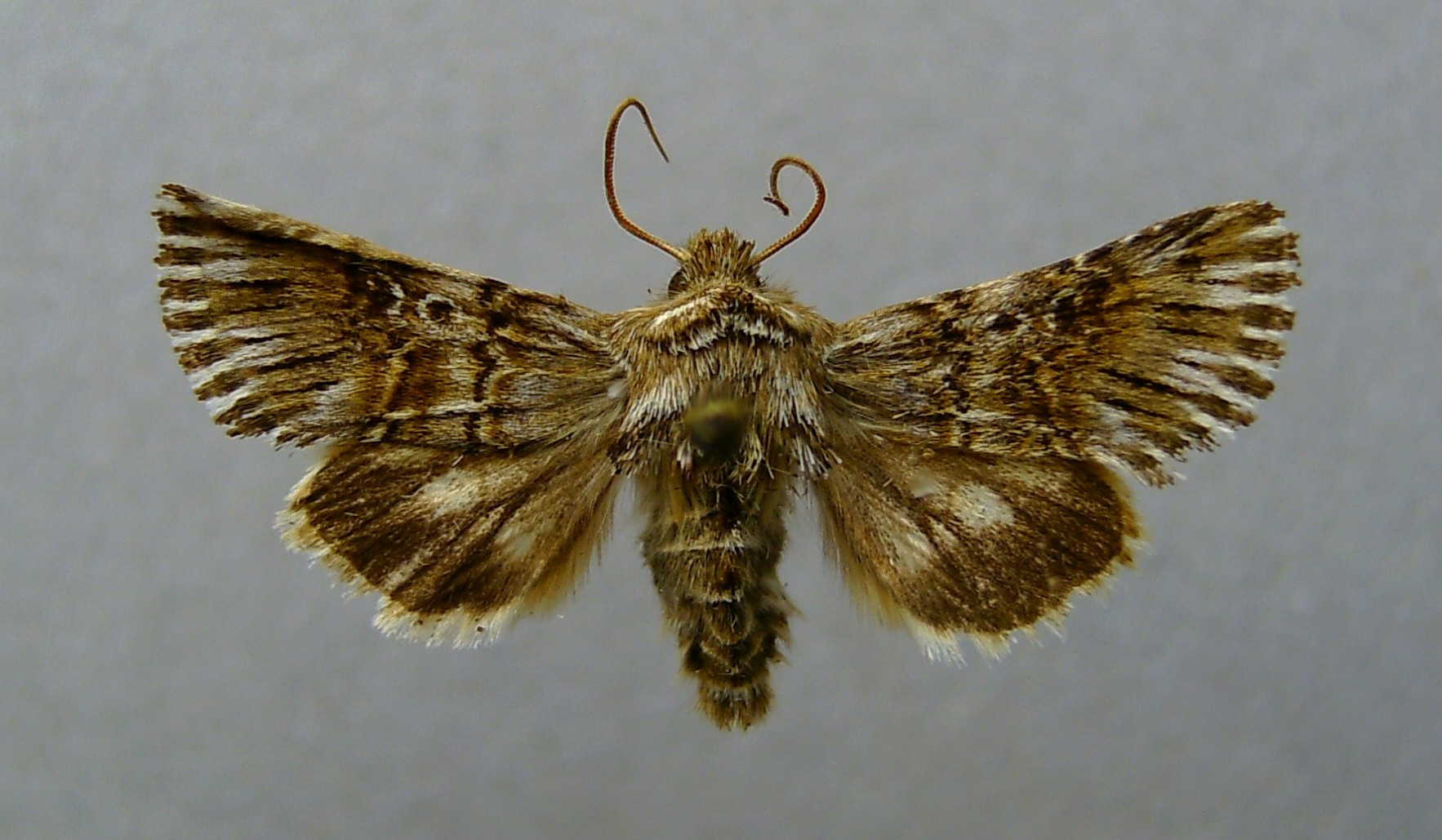

Scientific classification
- Kingdom: Animalia
- Phylum: Arthropoda
- Class: Insecta
- Order: Lepidoptera
- Superfamily: Noctuoidea
- Family: Noctuidae
- Genus: Omphalophana
- Species: O. antirrhinii

Binomial name
- Omphalophana antirrhinii (Hübner, [1803])

Synonyms
- Noctua antirrhinii Hübner, [1803]; Omphalophana asiatica Osthelder, 1933

= Omphalophana antirrhinii =

Species of moth

Omphalophana antirrhinii is a moth of the family Noctuidae. It is found from southern France through all southern Europe (with the exception of the extreme west of the Iberian Peninsula), Corsica, Sardinia towards northern Iraq, western Iran, Jordan and Israel.

The wingspan is 26–32 mm. Adults are on wing from March to May. There is one generation per year.

The larvae feed on Antirrhinum, Linaria, Cephalaria, Delphinium and Scabiosa species.

== Subspecies ==
- Omphalophana antirrhinii antirrhinii
- Omphalophana antirrhinii asiatica (Israel,...)
