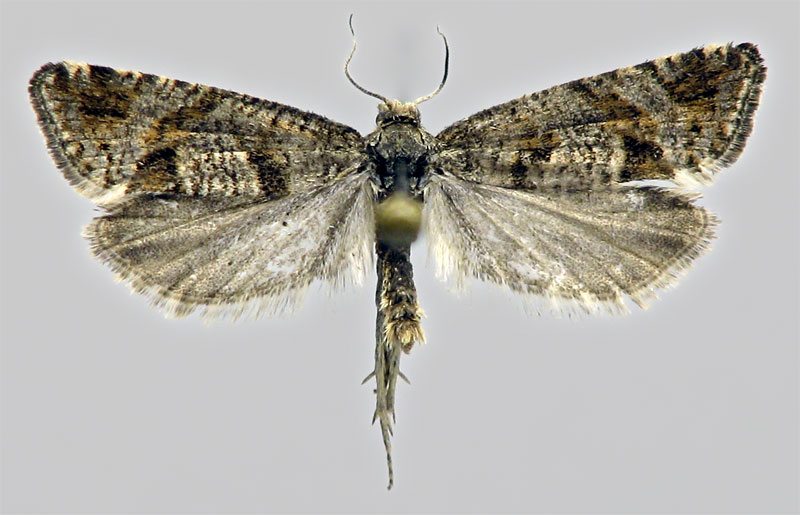

Scientific classification
- Kingdom: Animalia
- Phylum: Arthropoda
- Class: Insecta
- Order: Lepidoptera
- Family: Tortricidae
- Genus: Eriopsela
- Species: E. quadrana

Binomial name
- Eriopsela quadrana (Hübner, 1813)

Synonyms
- Tortrix quadrana Hubner, [1811-1813]; Steganoptycha quadratana var. abiscoana Caradja, 1916; Steganoptycha quadrana var. abiskoana Caradja, 1916; Eriopsela bavarica Obraztsov, 1952; Semasia quadrana ab. ochracea Orstadius, 1932; Steganoptycha quadratana var. abiscoana quadratana Caradja, 1916; Eriopsela roseni Obraztsov, 1952

= Eriopsela quadrana =

Species of moth

Eriopsela quadrana is a moth of the family Tortricidae. It is found in most of Europe (except Iceland, the Iberian Peninsula, Ukraine, and the Balkan Peninsula), east to the eastern part of the Palearctic realm.

The wingspan is about 12–16 mm. The forewings are elongate and the costa is almost straight. The ground colour is whitish-grey, striated with dark fuscous. The costa is posteriorly spotted with dark fuscous. The edge of basal patch is obtusely angulated in the middle. There is a slender dorsally dilated central fascia, and an irregular spot before the termen in middle. Both are rather dark fuscous and distinctly darker dorsally. The hind wings are grey, beneath much suffused with whitish.

Adults are on wing from May to June. They appear in the late afternoon.

The larvae feed on Solidago virgaurea and Succissa pratensis. They fold the leaves upwards and feed within.
