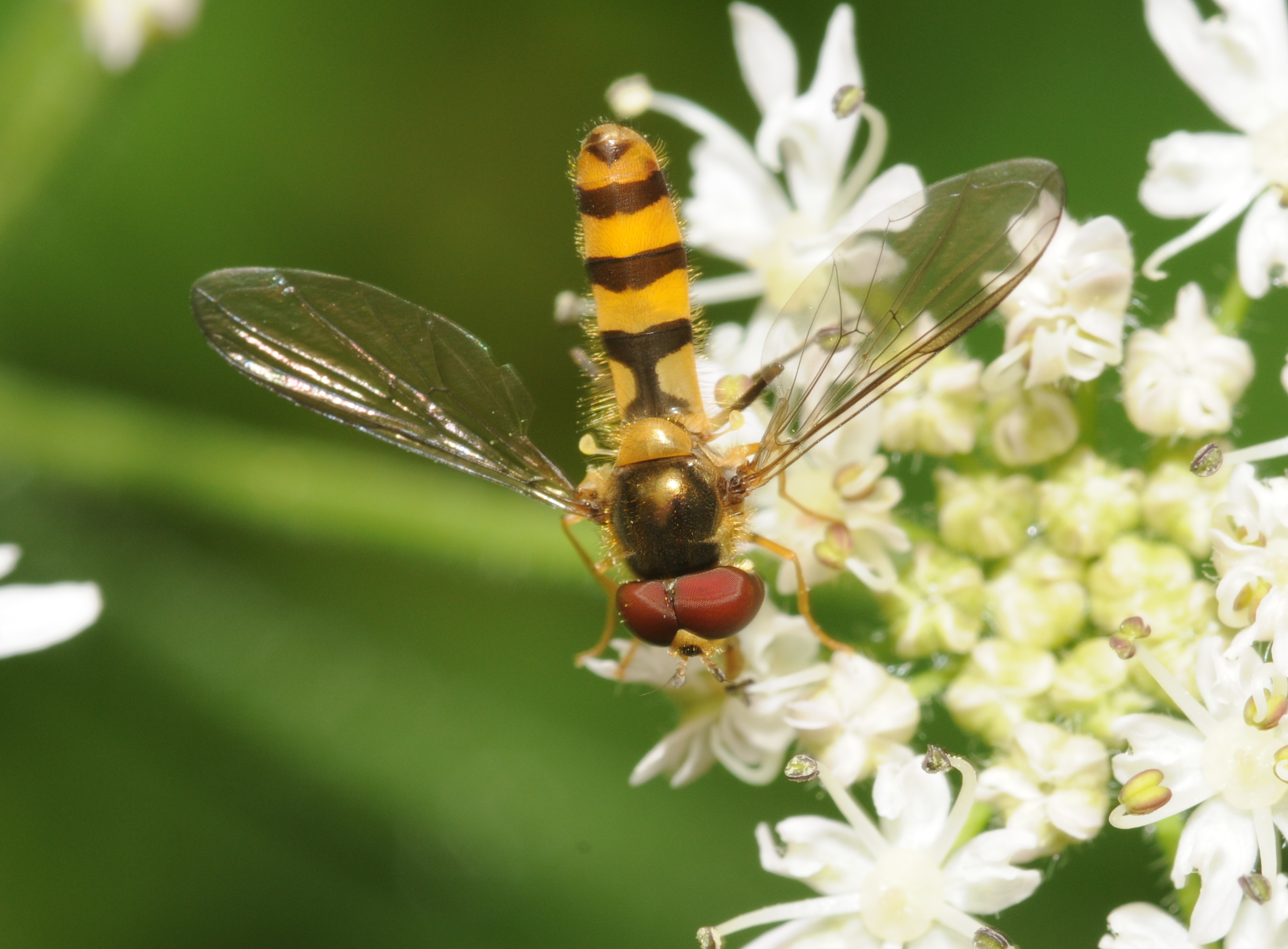
- Male
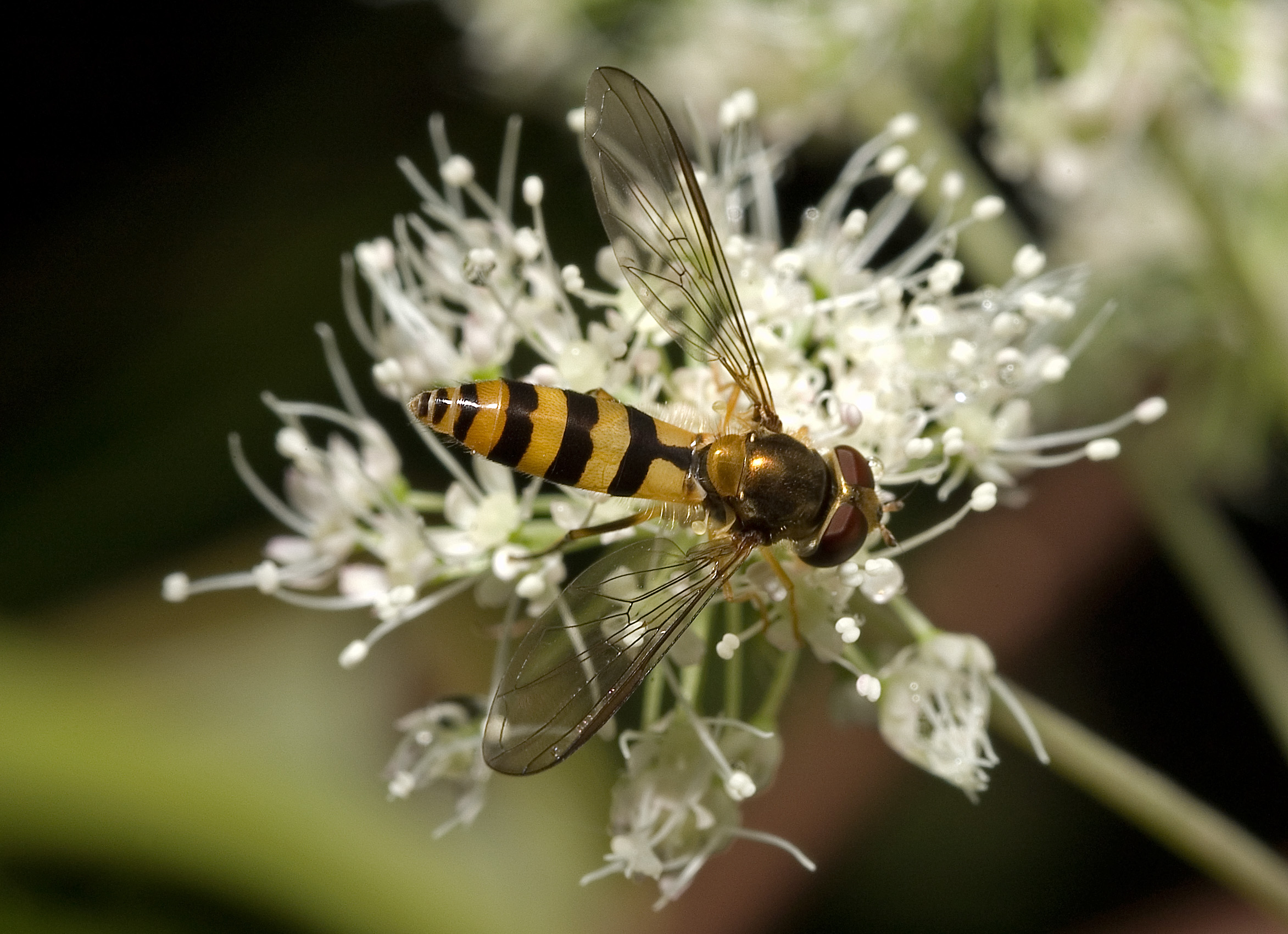
- Female

Scientific classification
- Kingdom: Animalia
- Phylum: Arthropoda
- Clade: Pancrustacea
- Class: Insecta
- Order: Diptera
- Family: Syrphidae
- Genus: Meliscaeva
- Species: M. cinctella

Binomial name
- Meliscaeva cinctella (Zetterstedt, 1843)

Synonyms
- Scaeva cinctella Zetterstedt, 1843

= Meliscaeva cinctella =

Species of fly

Meliscaeva cinctella is a Holarctic species of hoverfly.

== Description ==
For terms see Morphology of Diptera
Wing length 7–9.75 mm. Elongated body. Lunula black with a black mark above it. Face entirely yellow. The alula is a narrow, rectangule. Tergite 2 with broad, square yellow marks. Tergites 3 and 4 with broad yellow bands which extend to the abdominal margin and have little points (one pointing forwards and the other backwards). See references for determination. The male genitalia are figured by Hippa (1968). Larva described and figured by Rotheray (1994).

== Distribution ==
Palearctic: Fennoscandia South to Iberia the Mediterranean basin. Ireland East through most of Europe, Turkey and European Russian then East to Siberia and the Russian Far East to the Pacific coast (Kuril Isles). Nearctic: Alaska south to California and Colorado.

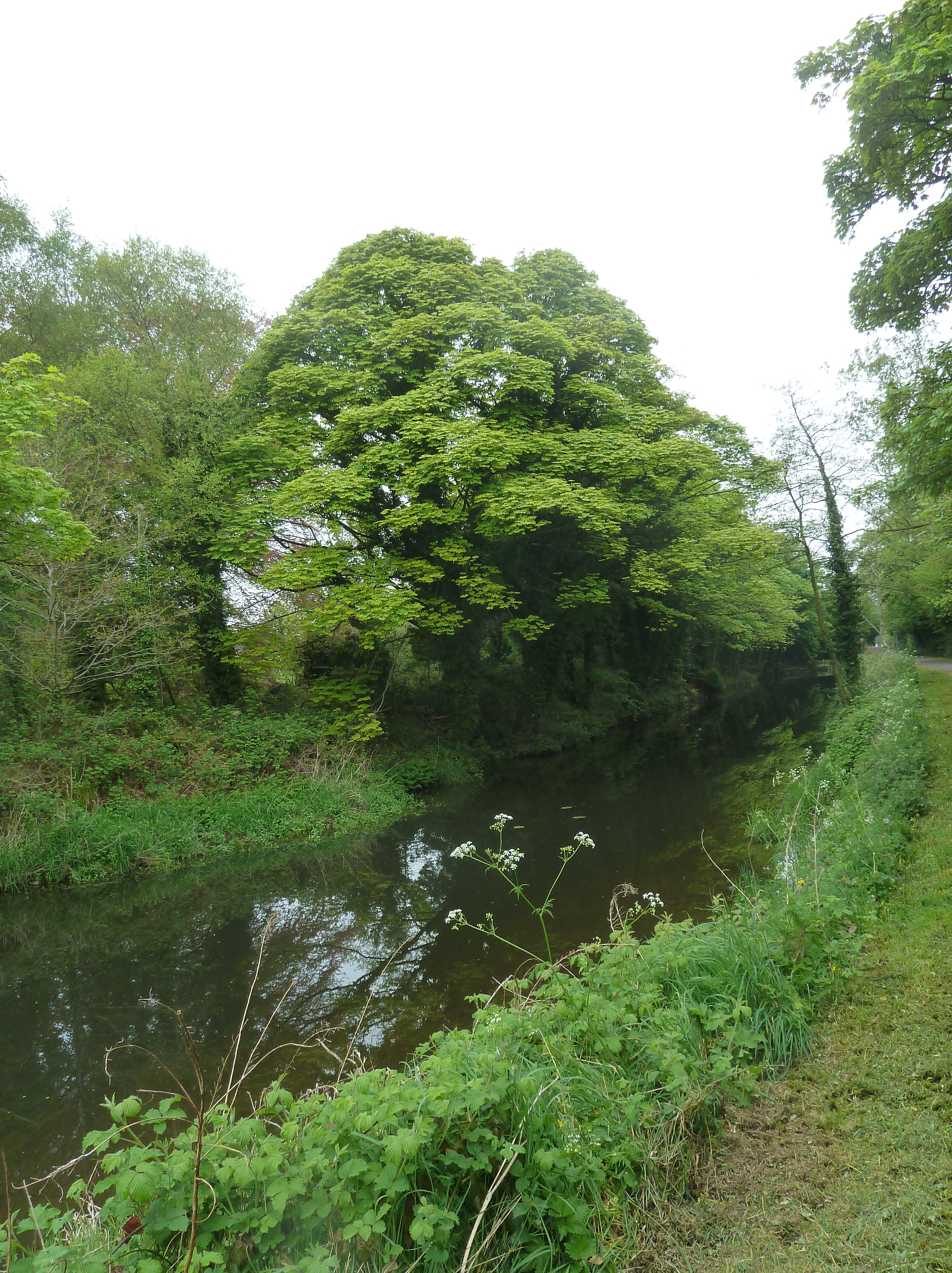
Habitat in Ireland

== Biology ==
The species' habitat includes deciduous and coniferous forest, hedgerows and suburban gardens and parks. Flowers visited include white umbellifers, Acer pseudoplatanus, Crataegus, Euphorbia, Ilex, Ligustrum, Lonicera periclymenum, Origanum vulgare, Polygonum cuspidatum, Potentilla erecta, Prunus spinosa, Ranunculus, Rhododendron, Rubus fruticosus, Rubus idaeus, Salix, Sambucus, Senecio jacobaea, Solidago virgaurea, Sorbus aucuparia and Taraxacum . The flight period is April to September. The larva feeds on aphids on bushes, shrub and trees.
