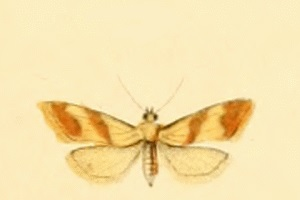

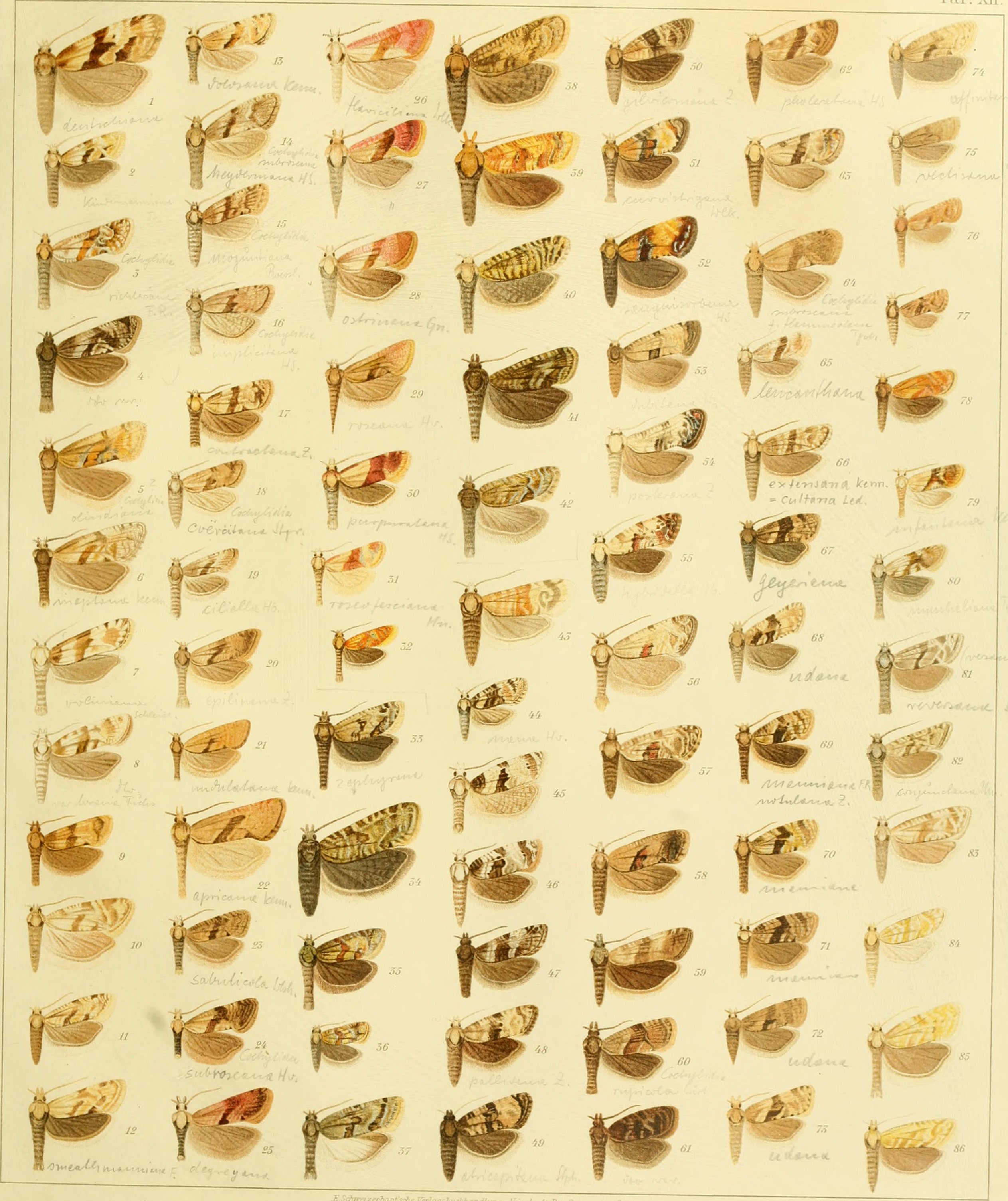
- in Kennel Die palaearktischen tortriciden figure 20, male, 63 Original (Unicum)

Scientific classification
- Kingdom: Animalia
- Phylum: Arthropoda
- Clade: Pancrustacea
- Class: Insecta
- Order: Lepidoptera
- Family: Tortricidae
- Genus: Cochylis
- Species: C. epilinana

Binomial name
- Cochylis epilinana Duponchel, in Godart, 1842

Synonyms
- Cochylis carpophilana Staudinger, 1859; Cochylis epiliana Svensson, 1966

= Cochylis epilinana =

Species of moth

Cochylis epilinana is a species of moth of the family Tortricidae. It is found in most of Europe, Asia Minor, Israel and northern Syria.

The wingspan is 13–15 mm. Adults are on wing from May to August.

The larvae feed on Linum usitatissimum, Linum catharticum, Linum campanullatum, Solidago and Cephalaria leucantha.
