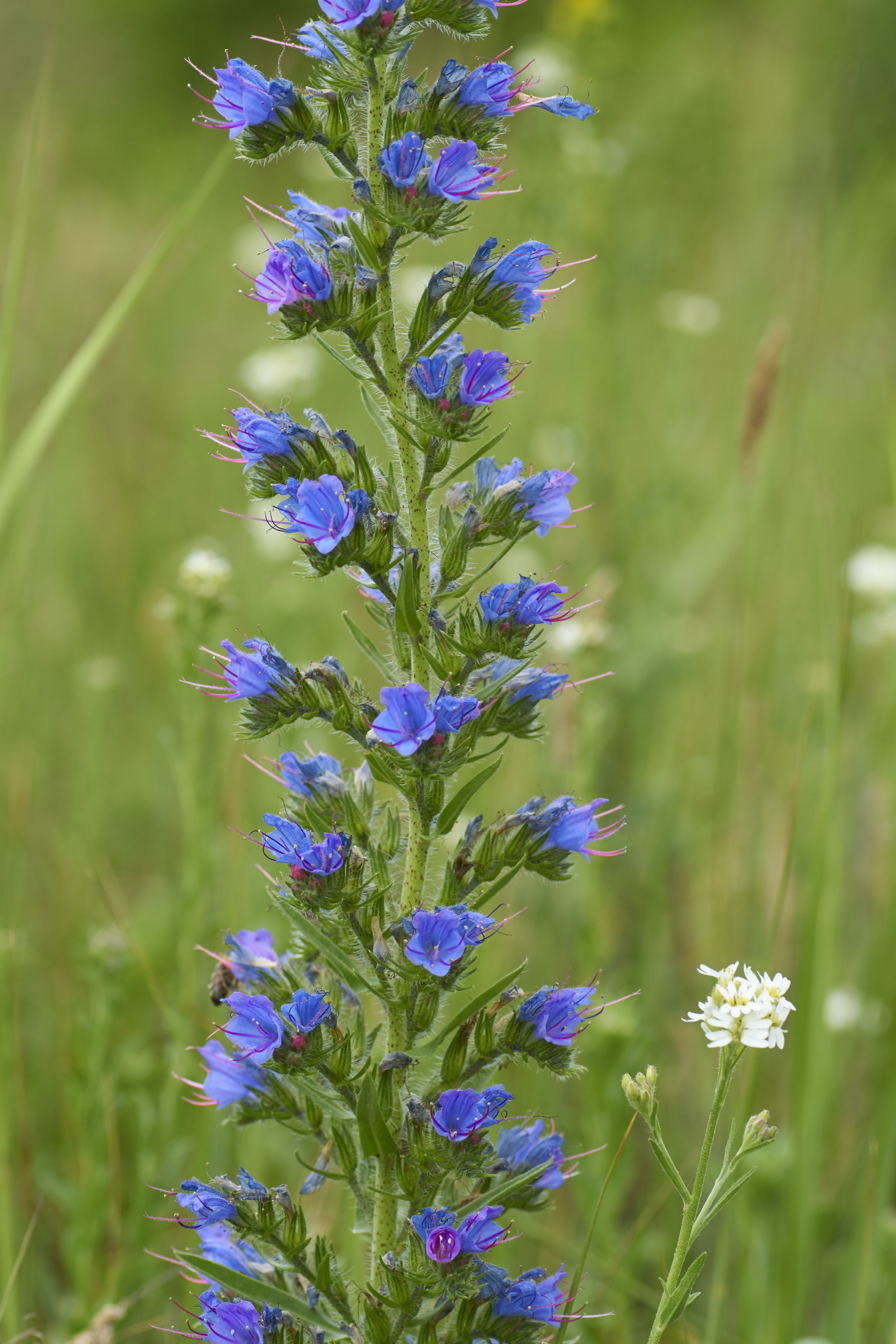

Scientific classification
- Kingdom: Plantae
- Clade: Tracheophytes
- Clade: Angiosperms
- Clade: Eudicots
- Clade: Asterids
- Order: Boraginales
- Family: Boraginaceae
- Genus: Echium
- Species: E. vulgare

Binomial name
- Echium vulgare L.

= Echium vulgare =

Viper's bugloss

Species of flowering plant

Echium vulgare, known as viper's bugloss and blueweed, is a species of flowering plant in the borage family Boraginaceae. It is native to most of Europe and western and central Asia and it occurs as an introduced species in north-eastern North America, south-western South America and the South and North Island of New Zealand. If eaten, the plant is toxic to horses and cattle through the accumulation of pyrrolizidine alkaloids in the liver.

The plant root was used in ancient times as a treatment for snake or viper bites. According to the Doctrine of signatures, plants were thought to have traits (in this case a speckled stem reminiscent of snake skin, and flowers like an open viper's mouth) that mirror the ailment they treat.

== Description ==
It is a biennial or monocarpic perennial plant growing to 30–80 cm (12–31 in) tall, with rough, hairy, oblanceolate leaves. The stems, which are red-flecked, resemble snake's skin and even the fruits are shaped like adders' heads. The flowers start pink and turn vivid blue, and are 15–20 mm (0.59–0.79 in) in a branched spike, with all the stamens protruding. The pollen is blue but the filaments of the stamens remain red, contrasting against the blue flowers. It flowers between May and September in the Northern Hemisphere. The Latin specific epithet vulgare means common.

== Distribution ==
It is native to Europe and temperate Asia. It has been introduced to Chile, New Zealand and North America, where it is naturalised in parts of the continent including Ontario and northern Michigan, being listed as an invasive species in Washington. It is found in dry, calcareous grassland and heaths, bare and waste places, along railways and roadsides and on coastal cliffs, sand dunes and shingle.

== Cultivation ==
E. vulgare is cultivated as an ornamental plant, and numerous cultivars have been developed. The cultivar 'Blue Bedder' has gained the Royal Horticultural Society's Award of Garden Merit.

== Gallery ==
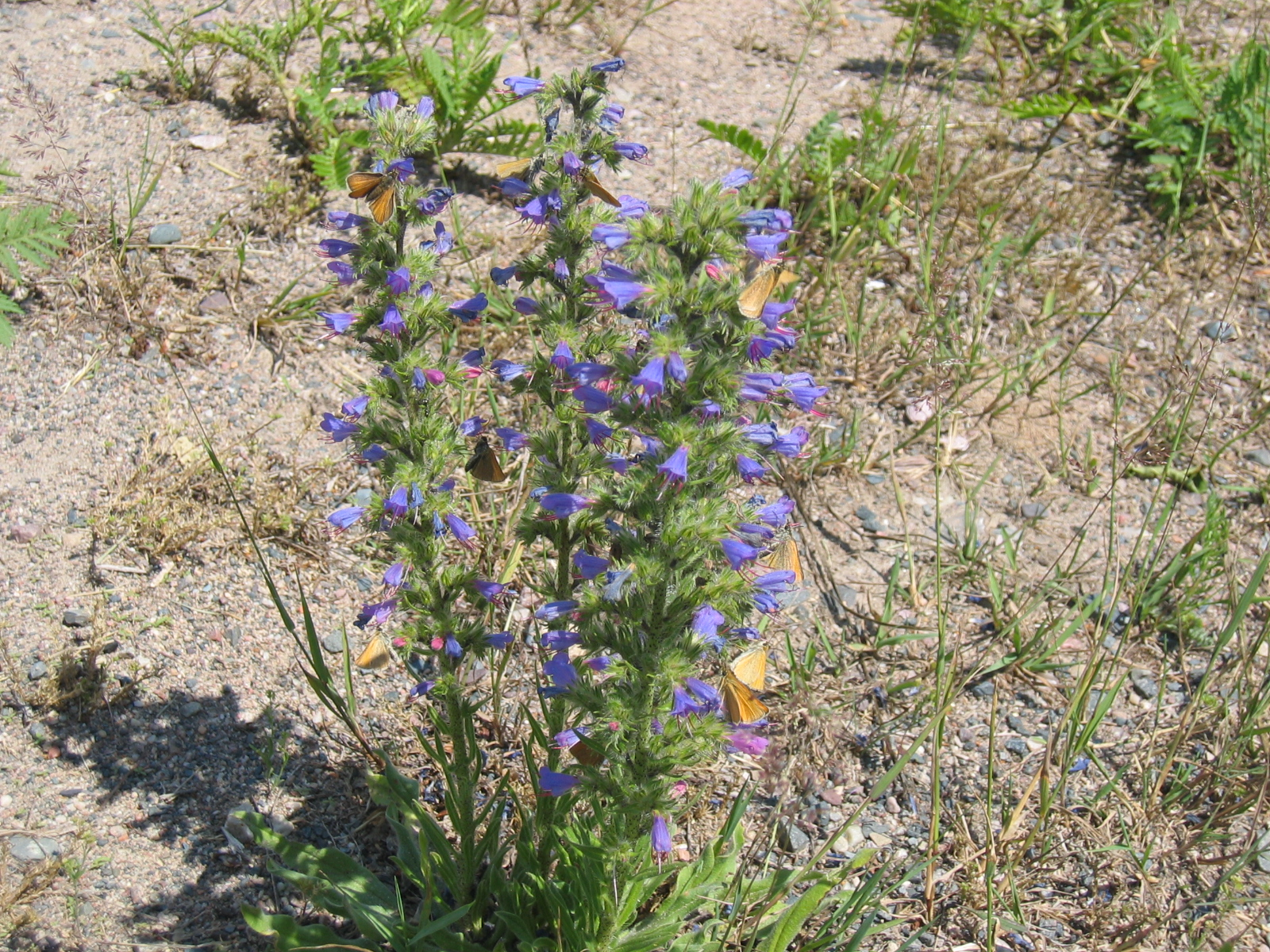
Being pollinated by skipper butterflies

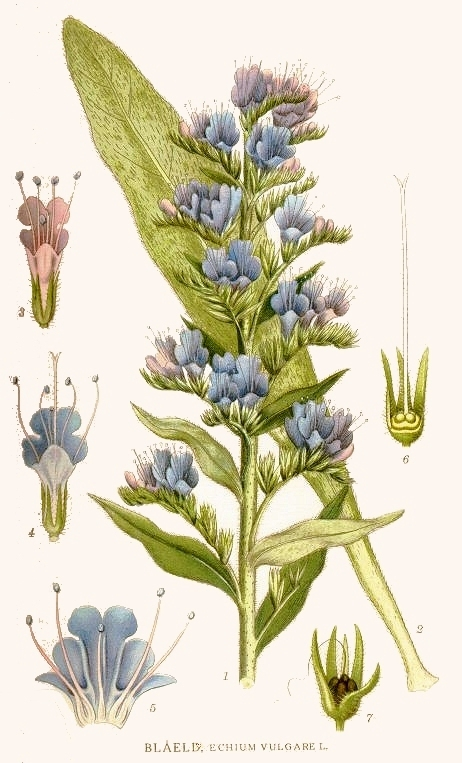
Illustration

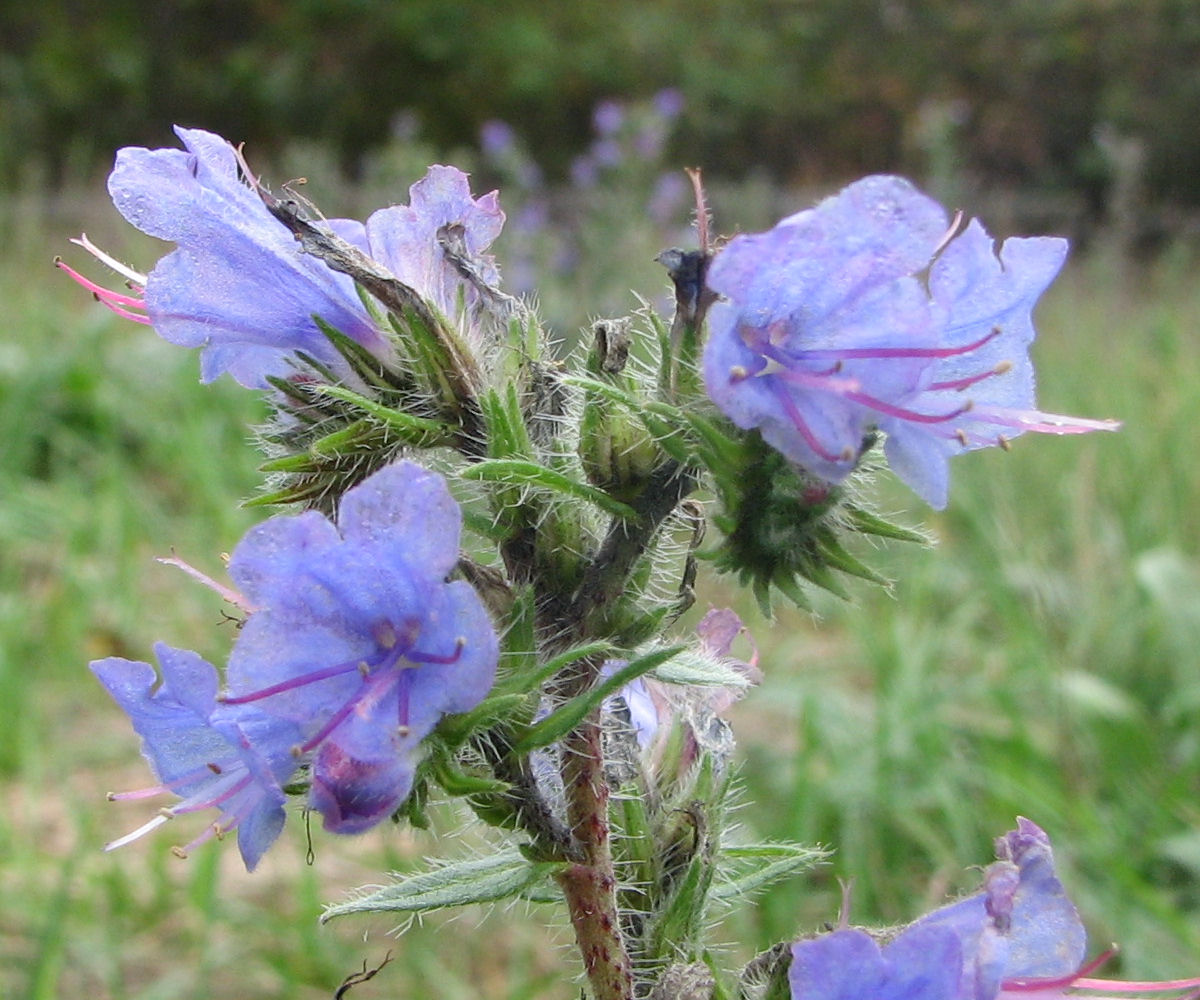
Closeup of flower

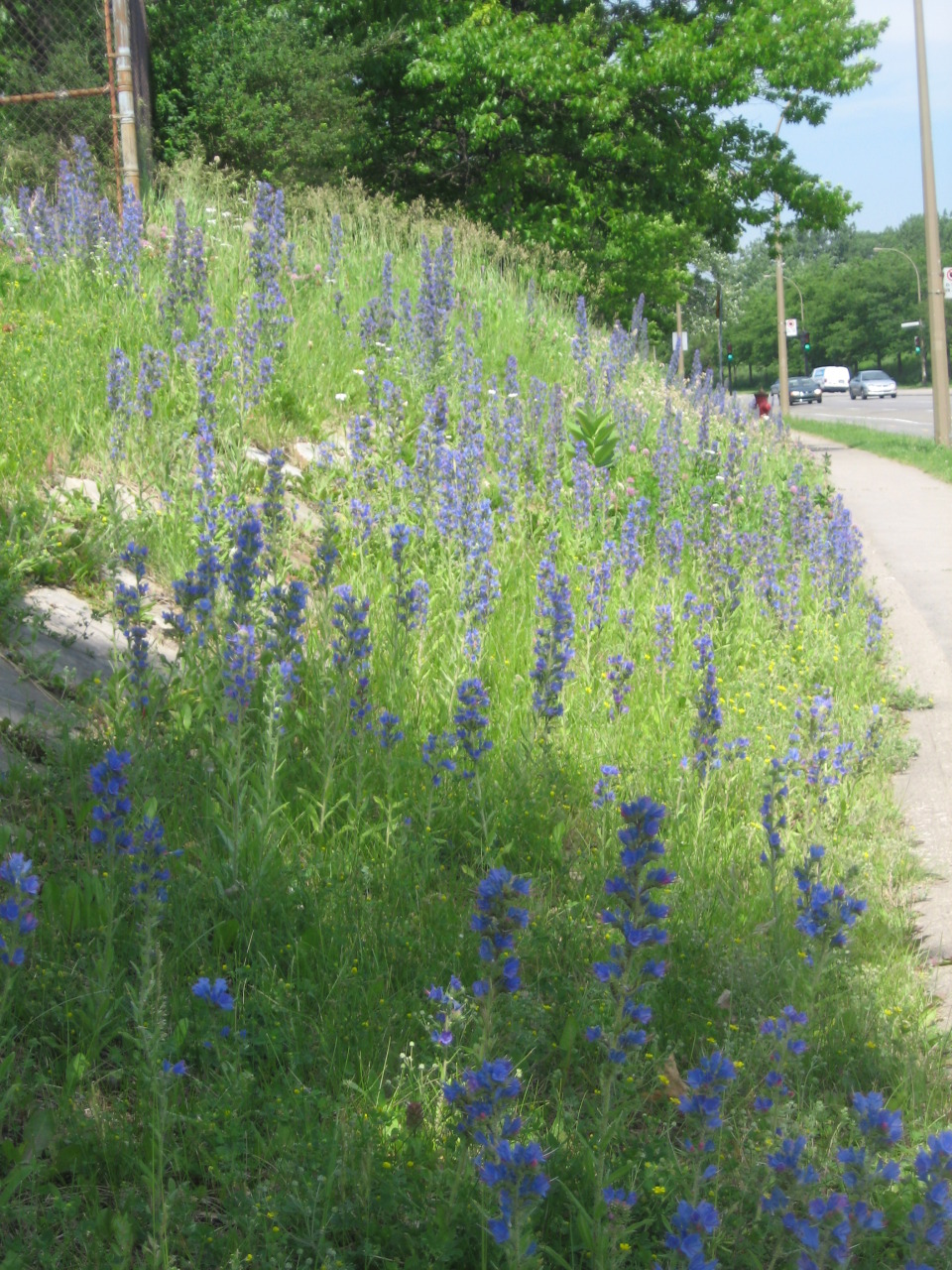
Colonizing the banks of a Montreal city highway

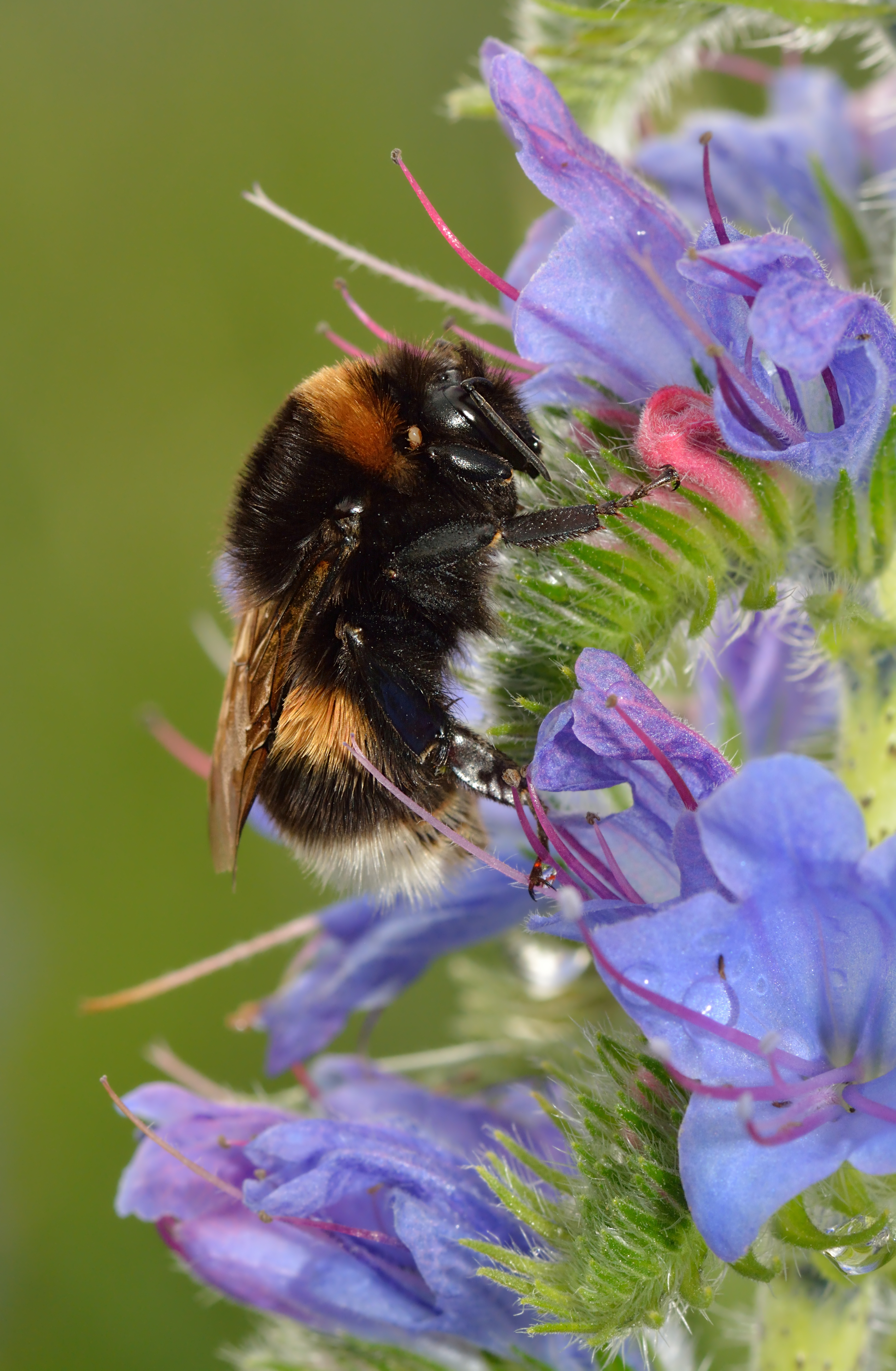
White-tailed bumblebee

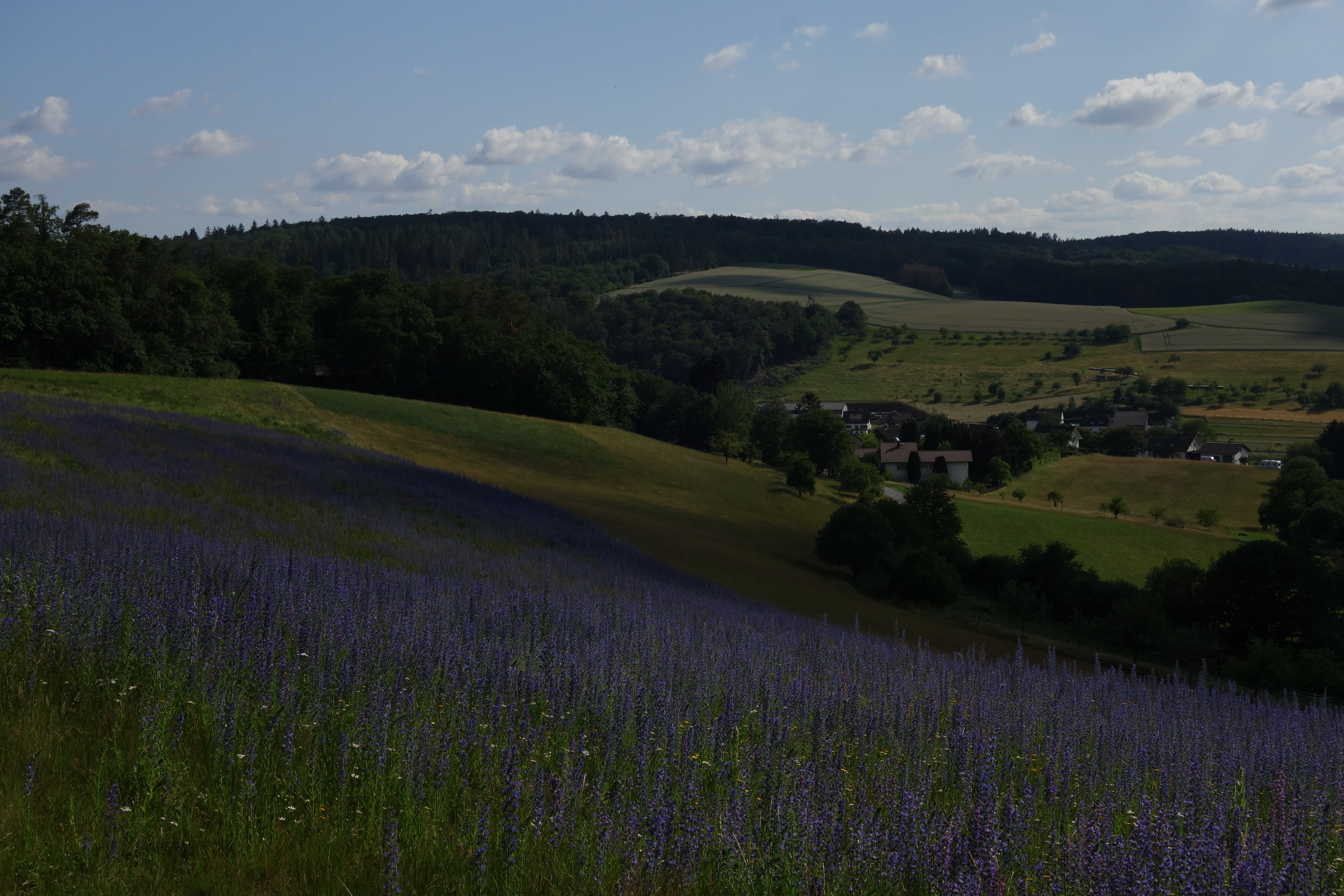
Extensive occurrence near Waldems-Wüstems in the Taunus

== See also ==
- Monofloral honey
- North American nectar sources
