= Omphalophana anatolica =

Scientific classification
- Domain: Eukaryota
- Kingdom: Animalia
- Phylum: Arthropoda
- Class: Insecta
- Order: Lepidoptera
- Superfamily: Noctuoidea
- Family: Noctuidae
- Genus: Omphalophana
- Species: O. anatolica

Binomial name
- Omphalophana anatolica (Lederer, 1857)

Synonyms
- Calophasia anatolica Lederer, 1857

Species of moth

Omphalophana anatolica is a moth of the family Noctuidae first described by Julius Lederer in 1857. It is found in south-eastern Europe, the Near East and Middle East.

Adults are on wing from March to May. There is one generation per year.
