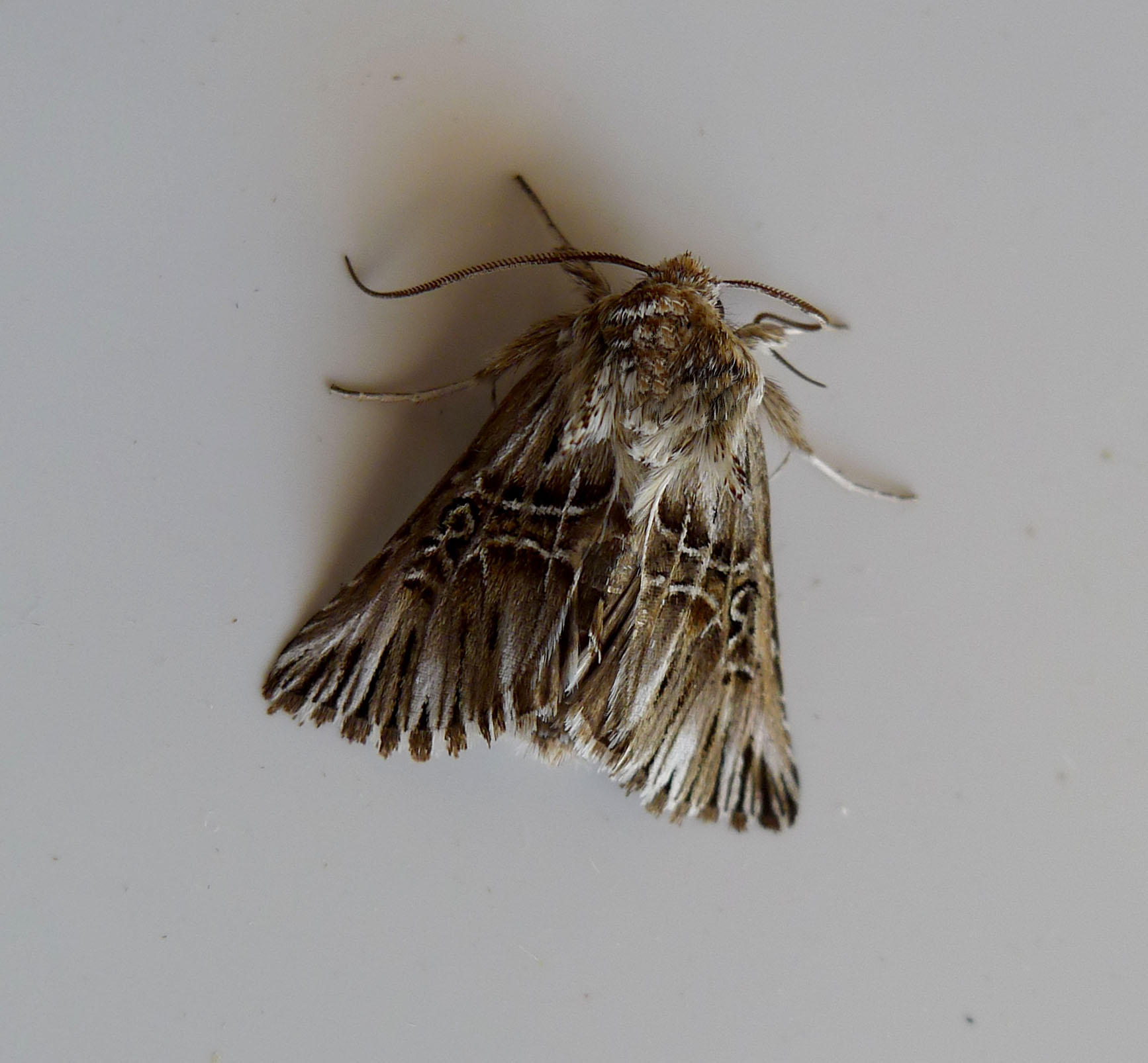

Scientific classification
- Domain: Eukaryota
- Kingdom: Animalia
- Phylum: Arthropoda
- Class: Insecta
- Order: Lepidoptera
- Superfamily: Noctuoidea
- Family: Noctuidae
- Genus: Omphalophana
- Species: O. serrata

Binomial name
- Omphalophana serrata (Treitschke, 1835)

Synonyms
- Cleophana serrata Treitschke, 1835; Cleophana arctata Guenée, 1852

= Omphalophana serrata =

Species of moth

Omphalophana serrata is a moth of the family Noctuidae. It is found in Morocco, Portugal, Spain, Sardinia, Italy and Sicily.

Adults are on wing in March, May and August.

The larvae feed on Scabiosa species.
