= Omphalophana serrulata =

Scientific classification
- Domain: Eukaryota
- Kingdom: Animalia
- Phylum: Arthropoda
- Class: Insecta
- Order: Lepidoptera
- Superfamily: Noctuoidea
- Family: Noctuidae
- Genus: Omphalophana
- Species: O. serrulata

Binomial name
- Omphalophana serrulata L.Ronkay & Gyulai, 2006

Species of moth

Omphalophana serrulata is a moth of the family Noctuidae. It is found in Iran.
