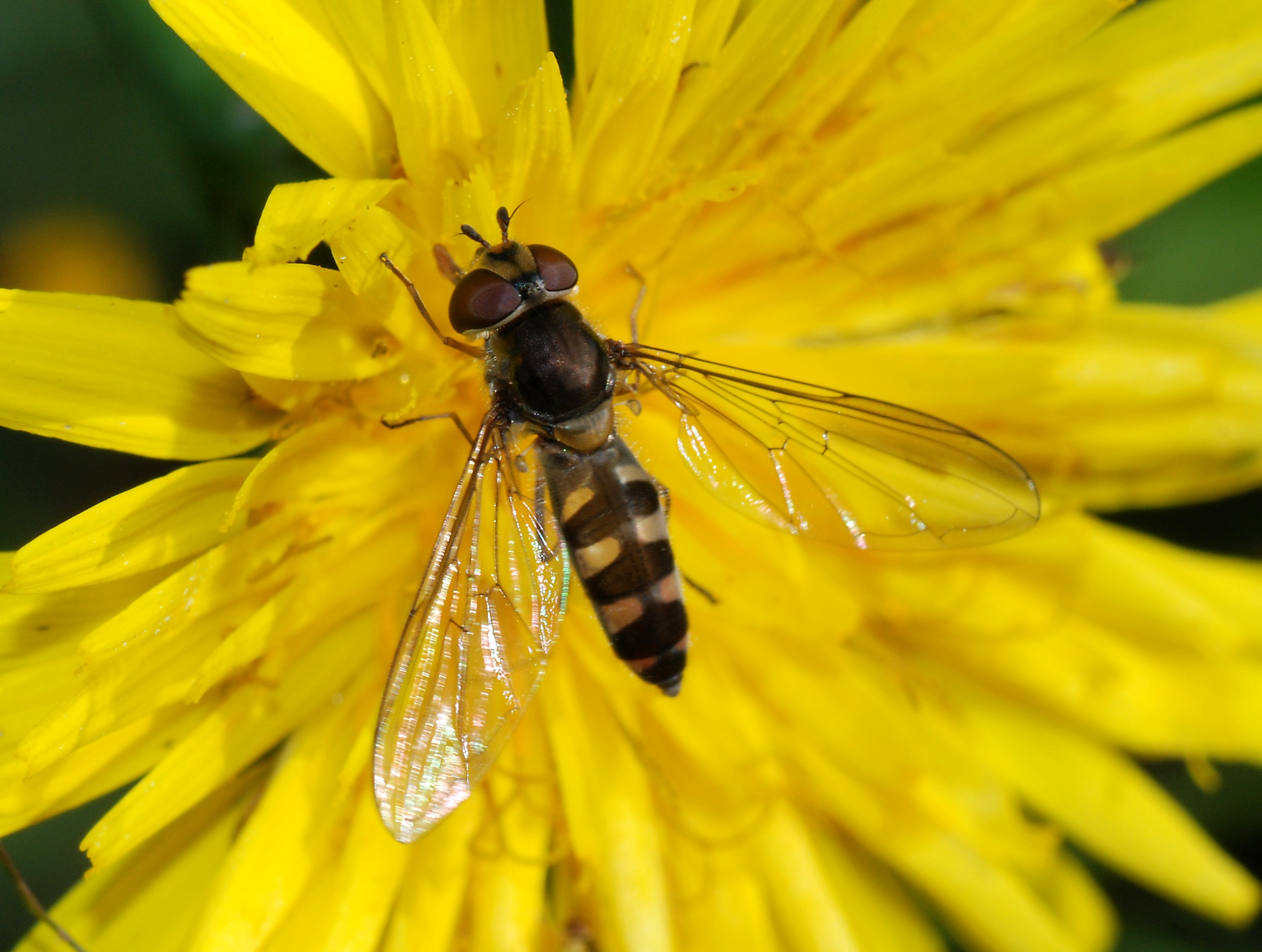
- Meliscaeva auricollis female

Scientific classification
- Kingdom: Animalia
- Phylum: Arthropoda
- Class: Insecta
- Order: Diptera
- Family: Syrphidae
- Subfamily: Syrphinae
- Genus: Meliscaeva; Frey, 1946

= Meliscaeva =

Genus of flies

Meliscaeva is a genus of hoverflies.

They have bare eyes, bare metasternum, bare metapisternum, the anterior anepisternum is usually pilose. Wing margin with a series of minute closely spaced black maculae on posterior margin.

Mostly Oriental, however, Meliscaeva cinctella is widely distributed in North America and Europe.

== Species ==
- M. abdominalis (Sack, 1927)
- M. auricollis (Meigen, 822 )
- M. ceylonica (Keiser, 1958)
- M. cinctella (Zetterstedt, 1843)
- M. cinctelloides Ghorpade, 1994
- M. darjeelingensis Datta & Chakraborti, 1986
- M. deceptor (Curran, 1928)
- M. ichthyops (Meijere, 1914)
- M. kusuma Ghorpade, 1994
- M. latifasciata Huo, Ren & Zheng, 2007
- M. lefroyi Ghorpade, 1994
- M. magnifica Ghorpade, 1994
- M. malaisei Ghorpade, 1994
- M. malayensis (Curran, 1928)
- M. mathisi Ghorpade, 1994
- M. melanostomoides (Hull, 1941)
- M. monticola (Meijere, 1914)
- M. morna (Curran, 1931)
- M. nigripes (Meijere, 1914)
- M. omogensis (Shiraki & Edashige, 1953)
- M. peteus (Curran, 1931)
- M. sonami (Shiraki, 1930)
- M. splendida Huo, Ren & Zheng, 2007
- M. strigifrons (Meijere, 1914)
- M. taiwana (Shiraki, 1930)
- M. tenuiformis (Curran, 1928)
- M. tribeni (Nayar, 1968)

== Links ==
Encyclopedia of Life
