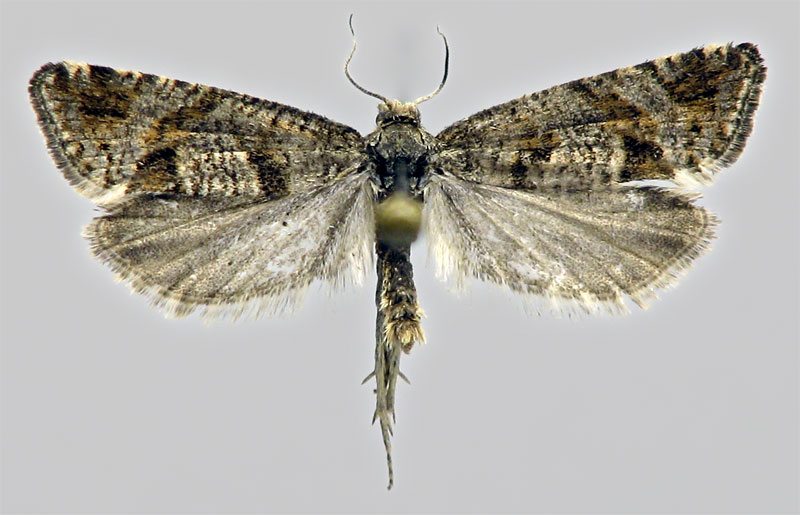
- Eriopsela quadrana

Scientific classification
- Domain: Eukaryota
- Kingdom: Animalia
- Phylum: Arthropoda
- Class: Insecta
- Order: Lepidoptera
- Family: Tortricidae
- Subfamily: Olethreutinae
- Genus: Eriopsela; Guenée, 1845

= Eriopsela =

Genus of tortrix moths

Eriopsela is a genus of moths belonging to the subfamily Olethreutinae of the family Tortricidae.

== Species ==
- Eriopsela aeriana (Falkovitsh, in Danilevsky, Kuznetsov & Falkovitsh, 1962)
- Eriopsela annana (Kennel, 1918)
- Eriopsela danilevskyi Kuznetzov, 1972
- Eriopsela falkovitshi Kostyuk, 1979
- Eriopsela fenestrellensis Huemer, 1991
- Eriopsela klapperichi Razowski, 1967
- Eriopsela klimeschi Obraztsov, 1952
- Eriopsela kostyuki (Kuznetzov, 1973)
- Eriopsela mongunana Kostyuk, 1973
- Eriopsela quadrana (Hübner, [1811-1813])
- Eriopsela rosinana (Kennel, 1918)

== See also ==
- List of Tortricidae genera
