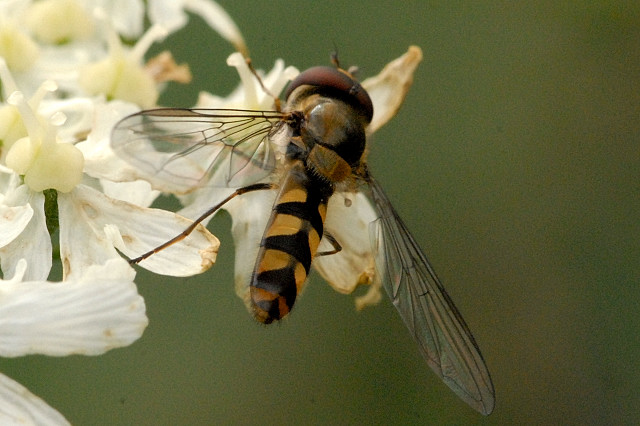
- Male
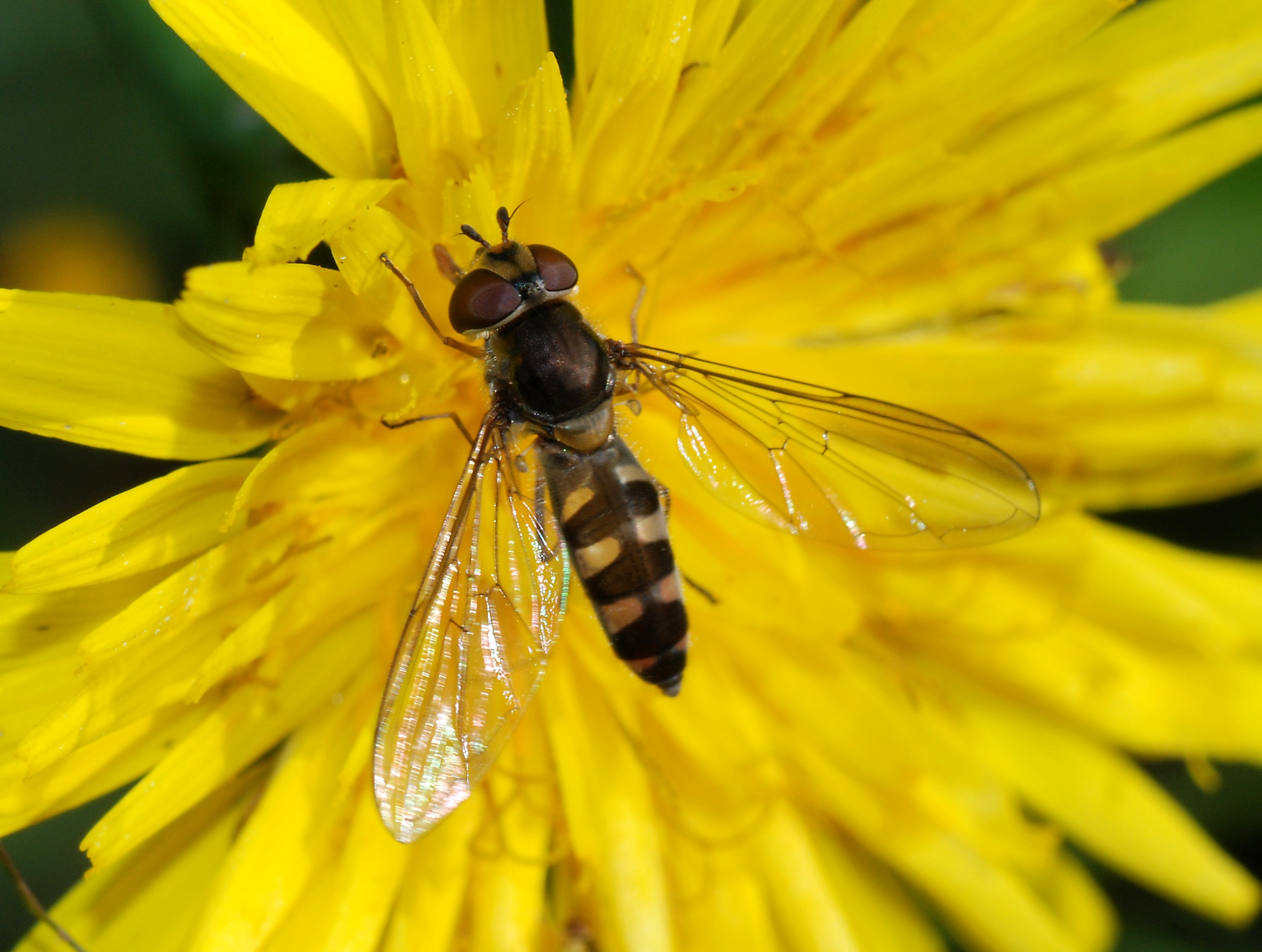
- Female

Scientific classification
- Kingdom: Animalia
- Phylum: Arthropoda
- Class: Insecta
- Order: Diptera
- Family: Syrphidae
- Genus: Meliscaeva
- Species: M. auricollis

Binomial name
- Meliscaeva auricollis (Meigen, 1822)

Synonyms
- List: Meliscaeva decora (Meigen, 1822); Meliscaeva maculicornis (Zetterstedt, 1843); Scaeva maculicornis Zetterstedt, 1843; Syrphus auricollis Meigen, 1822; Syrphus decorus Meigen, 1822

= Meliscaeva auricollis =

Species of fly

Meliscaeva auricollis is a West Palearctic species of hoverfly.

== Description ==
External images For terms see Morphology of Diptera
Wing length 6-9·5 mm. Elongated body. Lunula yellow with a black mark above it. Facial knob or more black; wing. Alula triangular. Tergite 2 usually with small elongate yellow marks, or small triangular marks. Tergites 3 and 4 with a pair of spots or narrowly connected bands. Elongated body. The male terminalia are figured by Hippa (1968). Larva described and figured by Rotheray (1994). See references for determination.

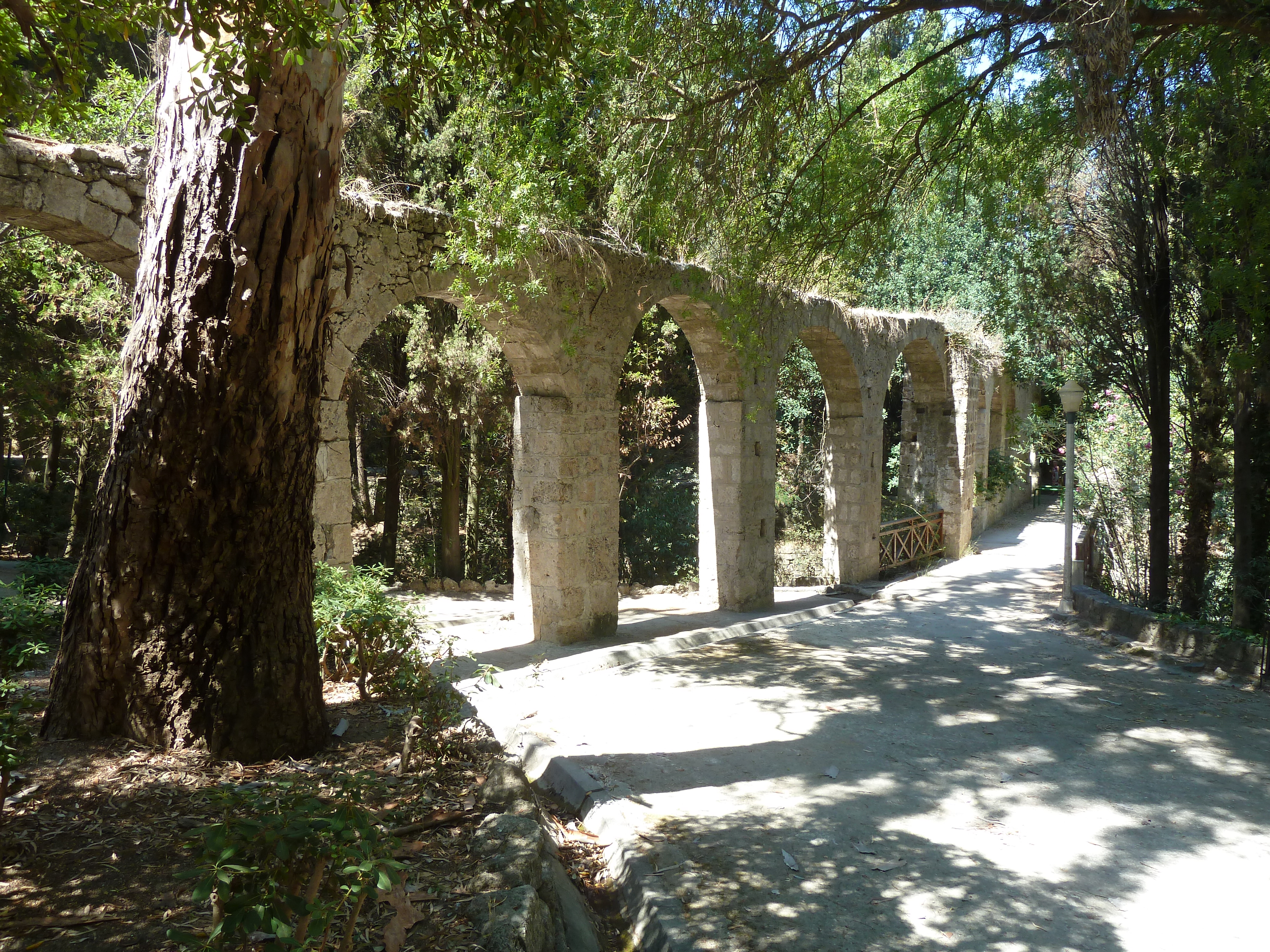
Habitat.Rhodes, Greece.

== Distribution ==
Palearctic Fennoscandia South to Iberia, the Mediterranean basin. Ireland East through Europe into European parts of Russia and Turkey.

== Biology ==
Habitat: Deciduous, broad-leaved evergreen and coniferous forest. Flowers visited include white umbellifers, Arbutus unedo, Chaerophyllum, Euonymus, Euphorbia, Filipendula, Hedera, Rubus, Salix, Sorbus, Viburnum opulus. The flight period is March to October (earlier and longer in southern Europe). The larva feeds on aphids or pysillids on trees.

Female visiting a flower of rosemary
