= Cephalaria anatolica =

Conservation status
- Critically Endangered (IUCN 3.1)

Scientific classification
- Kingdom: Plantae
- Clade: Embryophytes
- Clade: Tracheophytes
- Clade: Spermatophytes
- Clade: Angiosperms
- Clade: Eudicots
- Clade: Asterids
- Order: Dipsacales
- Family: Caprifoliaceae
- Genus: Cephalaria
- Species: C. anatolica

Binomial name
- Cephalaria anatolica Shkhiyan

Species of plant

Cephalaria anatolica is a critically endangered species of herbaceous plant in the family Caprifoliaceae, endemic to eastern Anatolia in Turkey. This slender perennial herb grows up to 1 metre tall with branching stems that have fine, downward-pointing hairs on their lower portions. It features distinctively variable leaves that are either simple or deeply divided into feather-like segments, and produces egg-shaped flower heads with yellow petals from June to July. First described in 1970, the species is restricted to rocky slopes, stony ground, and roadsides at elevations between 900 and 1100 metres. Its limited distribution, covering less than 500 km^{2} across no more than five localities, has led to its classification as critically endangered according to IUCN criteria.

== Description ==
Cephalaria anatolica is a slender, upright perennial herb reaching up to 1 m tall. The stem branches from near the base and has a coating of fine, downward-pointing hairs on its lower sections, becoming smooth and hairless toward the upper portions.

The leaves are somewhat leathery and consistently hairy across their surfaces. They vary in shape depending on their position along the stem. The lower leaves are either simple (undivided) or deeply divided into segments resembling a feather (pinnatisect). Simple leaves at the base are narrow, lance-shaped (lanceolate, measuring 3–12 cm long by 0.4–0.9 cm wide, with pointed tips. Pinnatisect lower leaves are lance-shaped overall, measuring 5–16 cm long by 1.5–4 cm wide, typically with 10–12 smaller lance-shaped or rectangular segments along each side. The segment at the tip of these divided leaves is larger than the others, broadly lance-shaped to somewhat egg-shaped, measuring 1.5–4 cm by 0.7–1.5 cm. The leaves higher up the stem are smaller, narrower, and similarly divided into 8–10 segments, each segment linear to lance-shaped. At the very top of the stem, leaves are simple, narrow, and directly attached without stalks, measuring just 0.4–3 cm by 0.1–0.2 cm.

The flower heads (capitula) are egg-shaped, measuring 1–1.5 cm across when flowering and shrinking slightly to 0.7–1.2 cm when fruiting. Each flower head is surrounded by overlapping scales called involucral bracts, which are egg-shaped, straw-coloured with occasional pale reddish-brown markings, hairy surfaces, and tiny hairs along their margins. Inside the flower head, receptacular bracts (scales supporting individual flowers) are elongated, straw-coloured at the base and reddish-brown towards the tip, also hairy and with margins fringed by tiny hairs, gradually tapering to a sharp point.

Each flower has a small, cup-shaped calyx measuring 2–3 mm across, with irregularly toothed edges. The petals form a yellow corolla 8–13 mm long, densely covered with soft, close-lying hairs on the outside. The involucel—a small structure enclosing the developing fruit—is four-angled, 4–6 mm long, hairy, and has eight very small, equal-sized teeth at the tip.

The flowering period of Cephalaria anatolica occurs from June to July, with fruits developing from July to August.

== Distribution ==
It is an endemic species to Turkey. Cephalaria anatolica grows on rocky slopes, stony ground, and along roadsides at elevations ranging from 900 to 1100 metres. The species is restricted specifically to the eastern Anatolia region, and belongs to the Irano-Turanian floristic group. Due to its limited distribution—occupying an area smaller than 500 km^{2} and found in no more than five distinct localities—it has been assessed as Endangered (EN) according to the IUCN Red List criteria B2ab(i, ii, iv).

== Taxonomy ==
The species was first described by the Soviet botanist Anna Schchian in: Zam. Sist. Geogr. Rast. 28: 26. in 1970.

== Chemistry ==
The aerial parts of Cephalaria anatolica contain a range of secondary metabolites, particularly two previously unknown triterpene glycosides named cephosides B and C, along with eleven other known compounds. These compounds belong to a class known as saponins, which are natural substances found in many plants with potential biological effects.
