= Omphalophana durnalayana =

Scientific classification
- Kingdom: Animalia
- Phylum: Arthropoda
- Class: Insecta
- Order: Lepidoptera
- Superfamily: Noctuoidea
- Family: Noctuidae
- Genus: Omphalophana
- Species: O. durnalayana

Binomial name
- Omphalophana durnalayana Osthelder, 1933

Species of moth

Omphalophana durnalayana is a moth of the family Noctuidae. It is found in Turkey and Iraq.

Adults are on wing in April and from June to August.
