= Cephalaria tuteliana =

Scientific classification
- Kingdom: Plantae
- Clade: Embryophytes
- Clade: Tracheophytes
- Clade: Angiosperms
- Clade: Eudicots
- Clade: Asterids
- Order: Dipsacales
- Family: Caprifoliaceae
- Genus: Cephalaria
- Species: C. tuteliana

Binomial name
- Cephalaria tuteliana Kuș & Göktürk

Species of flowering plant in the honeysuckle family

Cephalaria tuteliana is a species of flowering plant in the family Caprifoliaceae native to East Thrace in Turkey.
