= Omphalophana pauli =

Scientific classification
- Kingdom: Animalia
- Phylum: Arthropoda
- Class: Insecta
- Order: Lepidoptera
- Superfamily: Noctuoidea
- Family: Noctuidae
- Genus: Omphalophana
- Species: O. pauli

Binomial name
- Omphalophana pauli (Staudinger, 1892)

Species of moth

Omphalophana pauli is a moth of the family Noctuidae first described by Otto Staudinger in 1892. It is found in a narrow zone from Morocco, Algeria and Tunisia through Libya, Jordan and Israel to Syria and southern Turkey.

Adults are on wing from March to May. There is one generation per year.
