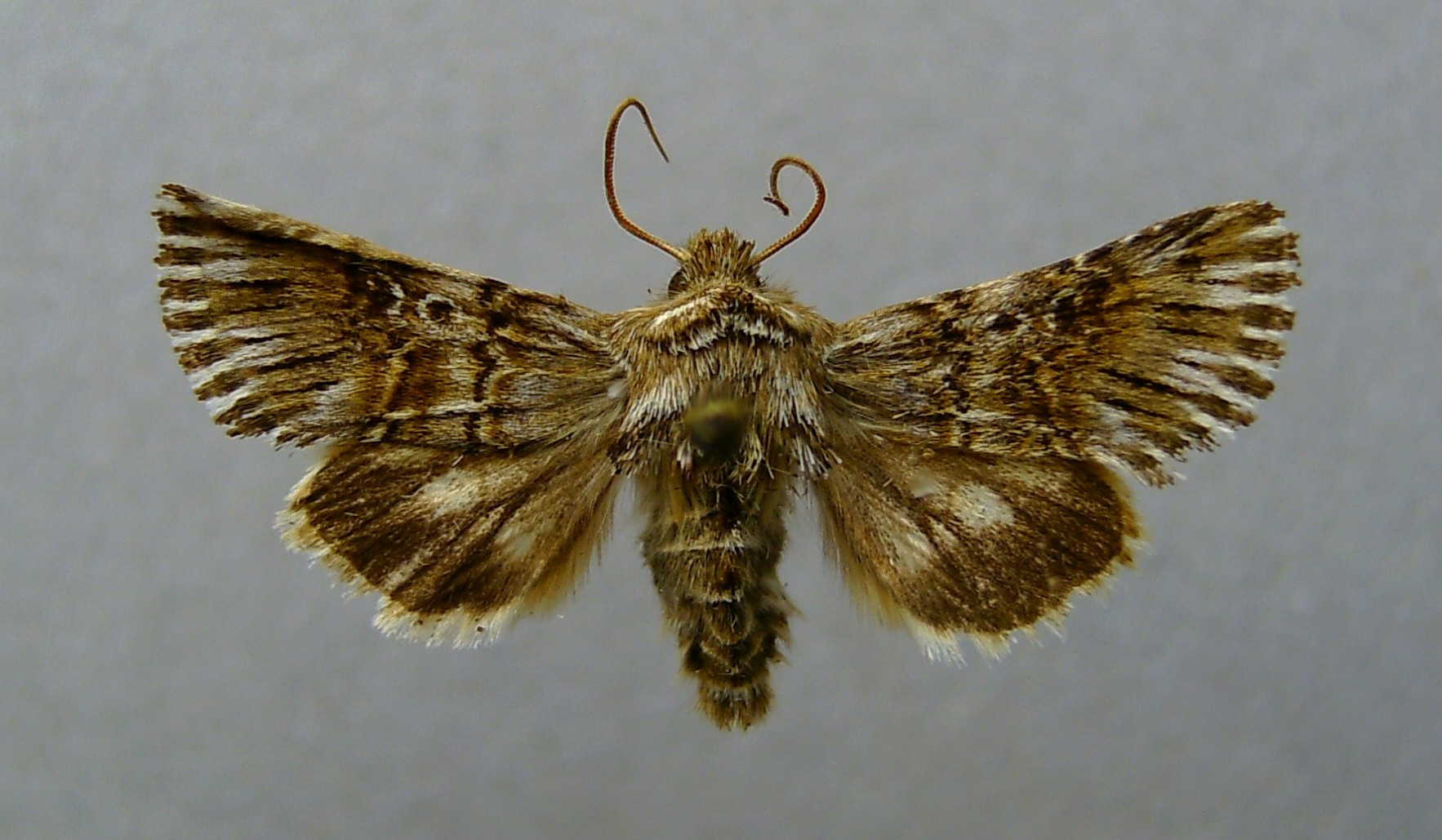
- Omphalophana antirrhinii

Scientific classification
- Kingdom: Animalia
- Phylum: Arthropoda
- Class: Insecta
- Order: Lepidoptera
- Superfamily: Noctuoidea
- Family: Noctuidae
- Subfamily: Cuculliinae
- Genus: Omphalophana; Hampson, 1906

= Omphalophana =

Genus of moths

Omphalophana is a genus of moths of the family Noctuidae.

== Species ==
- Omphalophana anatolica Lederer, 1857
- Omphalophana antirrhinii Hübner, 1803
- Omphalophana durnalayana Osthelder, 1933
- Omphalophana pauli (Staudinger, 1892)
- Omphalophana serrata Treitschke, 1835
- Omphalophana serrulata L.Ronkay & Gyulai, 2006
