= Cephalaria duzceensis =

Scientific classification
- Kingdom: Plantae
- Clade: Embryophytes
- Clade: Tracheophytes
- Clade: Angiosperms
- Clade: Eudicots
- Clade: Asterids
- Order: Dipsacales
- Family: Caprifoliaceae
- Genus: Cephalaria
- Species: C. duzceensis

Binomial name
- Cephalaria duzceensis Aksoy & Göktürk

Species of flowering plant in the honeysuckle family

Cephalaria duzceensis is a species of flowering plant in the family Caprifoliaceae native to western Black Sea region of Turkey.

== Distribution and habitat ==
This species is only known from few locations in northwestern Turkey. It grows in Pinus sylvestris forests on stony slopes at 1,000–1,200 m (3,300–3,900 ft).
