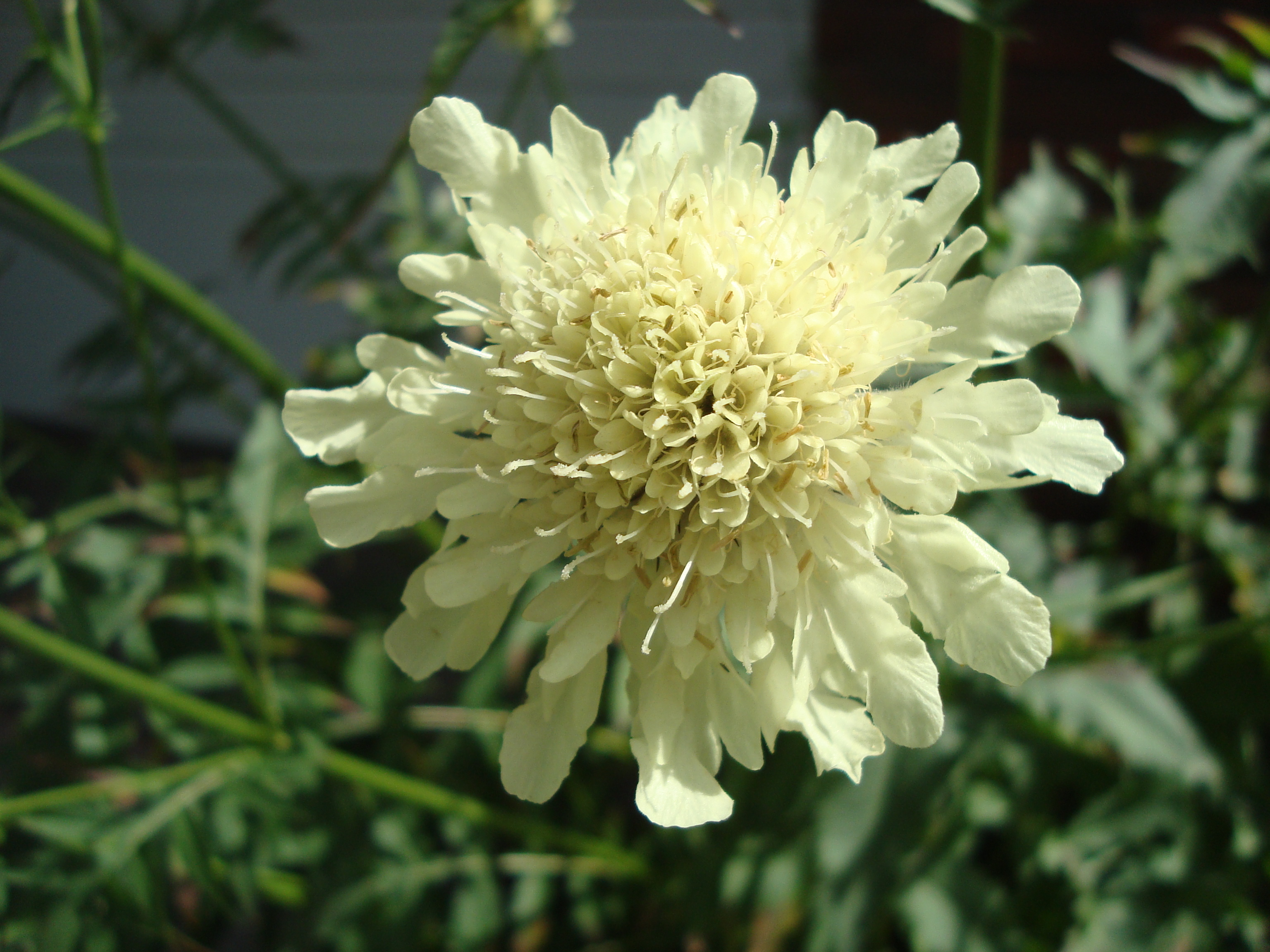

Scientific classification
- Kingdom: Plantae
- Clade: Tracheophytes
- Clade: Angiosperms
- Clade: Eudicots
- Clade: Asterids
- Order: Dipsacales
- Family: Caprifoliaceae
- Genus: Cephalaria
- Species: C. gigantea

Binomial name
- Cephalaria gigantea (Ledeb.) Bobrov

= Cephalaria gigantea =

Species of plant

Cephalaria gigantea (syn. Scabiosa gigantea), the giant scabious or yellow scabious, is a species of flowering plant in the honeysuckle family Caprifoliaceae. It is native to the Caucasus (Armenia, Georgia and Azerbaijan) and Turkey, but also cultivated as an ornamental.

This erect perennial has deciduous leaves, and pale yellow, ruffled flower heads in summer. The flowers resemble those of the closely related scabious plants. Growing to 2.5 m (8.2 ft), it may require staking in more exposed situations. It has a diploid chromosome number of 10 (2n = 10).
