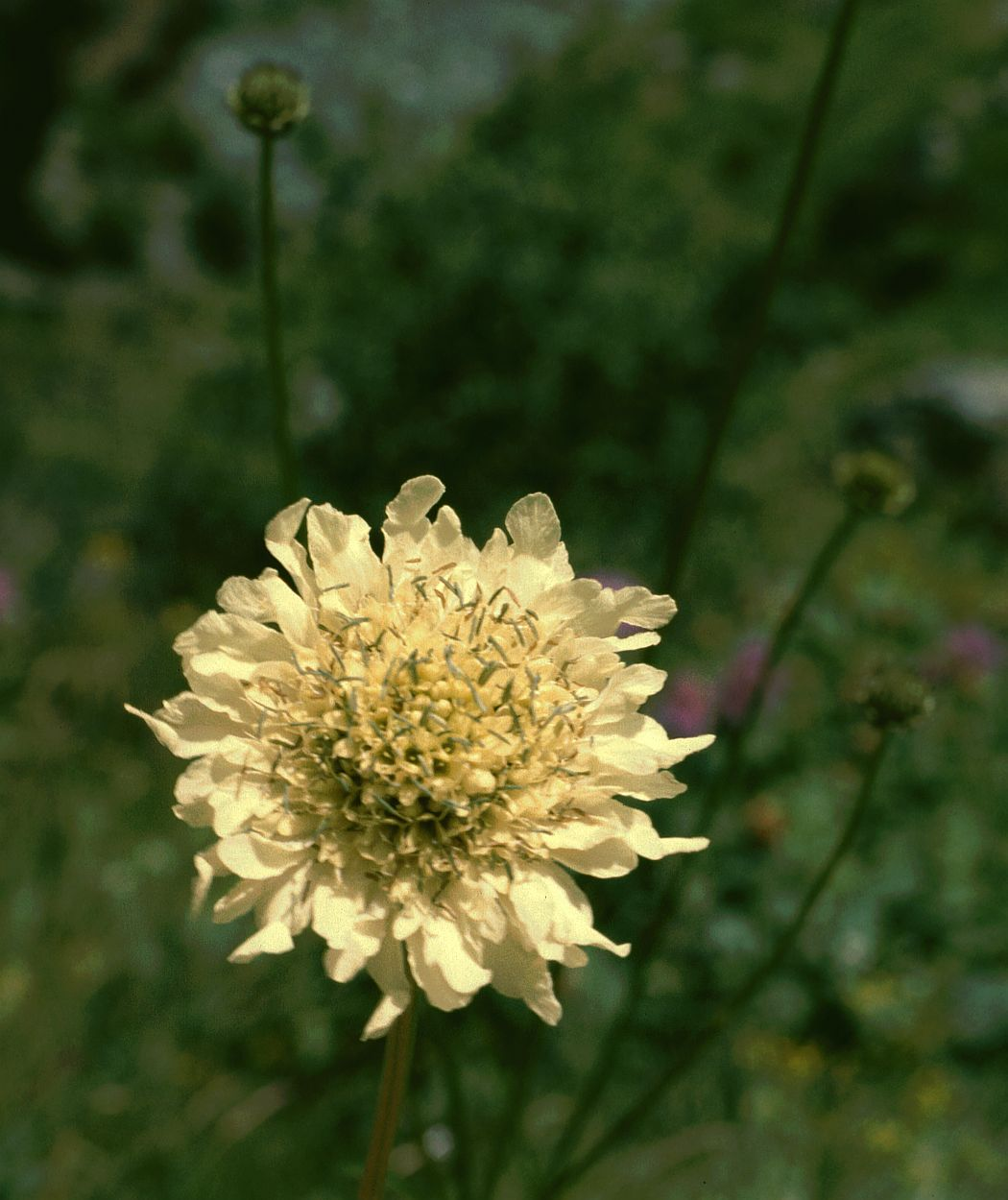
- Cephalaria gigantea Tatarian cephalaria

Scientific classification
- Kingdom: Plantae
- Clade: Embryophytes
- Clade: Tracheophytes
- Clade: Spermatophytes
- Clade: Angiosperms
- Clade: Eudicots
- Clade: Asterids
- Order: Dipsacales
- Family: Caprifoliaceae
- Subfamily: Dipsacoideae
- Genus: Cephalaria; Schrad. (1818), nom. cons.

Species
- 102; see text

Synonyms
- Cephalodes St.-Lag. (1881); Cerionanthus Schott ex Roem. & Schult. (1818); Lepicephalus Lag. (1816); Leucopsora Raf. (1838); Phalacrocarpus (Boiss.) Tiegh. (1909); Xetola Raf. (1838)

= Cephalaria =

Genus of flowering plants in the honeysuckle family

Cephalaria is a genus of flowering plants in the family Caprifoliaceae. It includes 102 species native to southern Europe, western and central Asia, and northern and southern Africa.

They are annual or perennial herbaceous plants growing to 0.8–2 m (2 ft 7 in – 6 ft 7 in) tall.

Cephalaria species are used as food plants by the larvae of some Lepidoptera species including Schinia imperialis, which feeds exclusively on C. procera.

== Species ==
102 species are accepted.

- Cephalaria adiyamanensis Yıld.
- Cephalaria alpina (L.) Roem. & Schult.
- Cephalaria ambrosioides (Sibth. & Sm.) Roem. & Schult.
- Cephalaria anamurensis Göktürk & Sümbül
- Cephalaria anatolica Shkhiyan
- Cephalaria aristata C.Koch
- Cephalaria armeniaca Bordz.
- Cephalaria armerioides Szabó
- Cephalaria armoraciifolia Bobrov
- Cephalaria attenuata (L.f.) Roem. & Schult.
- Cephalaria axillaris Hausskn. ex Bornm.
- Cephalaria aytachii Göktürk & Sümbül
- Cephalaria balansae Raus
- Cephalaria balkharica E.A.Busch
- Cephalaria beijiangensis Y.K.Yang, J.K.Wu & Sayit
- Cephalaria bojnordensis Ranjbar & Z.Ranjbar
- Cephalaria brevipalea (Sommier & Levier) Litv.
- Cephalaria calcarea Albov
- Cephalaria cedrorum Mouterde
- Cephalaria chaldoranensis Ranjbar & Z.Ranjbar
- Cephalaria cilicica Boiss. & Kotschy
- Cephalaria cilodaghensis Ranjbar & Z.Ranjbar
- Cephalaria coriacea (Willd.) Roem. & Schult. ex Steud.
- Cephalaria dagestanica Bobrov
- Cephalaria davisiana Göktürk & Sümbül
- Cephalaria decurrens (Thunb.) Roem. & Schult.
- Cephalaria demetrii Bobrov
- Cephalaria demirizii Göktürk & Sümbül
- Cephalaria dichaetophora Boiss.
- Cephalaria dirmilensis Hub.-Mor.
- Cephalaria duzceensis Aksoy & Göktürk
- Cephalaria ekimiana Göktürk & Sümbül
- Cephalaria elazigensis Göktürk & Sümbül
- Cephalaria elmaliensis Hub.-Mor. & V.A.Matthews
- Cephalaria fanourii Perdetzoglou & Kit Tan
- Cephalaria flava (Sibth. & Sm.) Szabó
- Cephalaria foliosa Compton
- Cephalaria galpiniana Szabó
- Cephalaria gazipashensis Sümbül
- Cephalaria gigantea (Ledeb.) Bobrov – Tatarian Cephalaria
- Cephalaria goetzei Engl.
- Cephalaria golestanica Ranjbar & Z.Ranjbar
- Cephalaria hakkiarica V.A.Matthews
- Cephalaria hirsuta Stapf
- Cephalaria humilis (Thunb.) Roem. & Schult.
- Cephalaria integerrima (Bornm.) Ranjbar & Z.Ranjbar
- Cephalaria integrifolia Napper
- Cephalaria isaurica V.A.Matthews
- Cephalaria joppensis (Rchb.) Coult. ex DC.
- Cephalaria juncea Boiss.
- Cephalaria katangensis Napper
- Cephalaria kesruanica Mouterde
- Cephalaria kleinii Ranjbar & Z.Ranjbar
- Cephalaria kotschyi Boiss. & Hohen.
- Cephalaria kurdistanica Maroofi, Tabad & Rastegar
- Cephalaria kutahyaensis Yıld.
- Cephalaria laevigata (Waldst. & Kit.) Schrad.
- Cephalaria leucantha (L.) Roem. & Schult.
- Cephalaria litvinovii Bobrov
- Cephalaria lycica V.A.Matthews
- Cephalaria mauritanica Pomel
- Cephalaria media Litv.
- Cephalaria microcephala Boiss.
- Cephalaria microdonta Bobrov
- Cephalaria nachiczevanica Bobrov
- Cephalaria natalensis Kuntze
- Cephalaria oblongifolia (Kuntze) Szabó
- Cephalaria paphlagonica Bobrov
- Cephalaria pastricensis Dörfl. & Hayek
- Cephalaria peshmenii Sümbül
- Cephalaria petiolata Compton
- Cephalaria procera Fisch. & Avé-Lall.
- Cephalaria pungens Szabó
- Cephalaria qeydarensis Ranjbar & Z.Ranjbar
- Cephalaria radiata Griseb. & Schenk
- Cephalaria retrosetosa Engl. & Gilg
- Cephalaria rigida (L.) Roem. & Schult.
- Cephalaria saldaensis Göktürk, Hamzaoğlu & Yüceol
- Cephalaria salicifolia Post
- Cephalaria scabra (L.f.) Roem. & Schult.
- Cephalaria scoparia Contandr. & Quézel
- Cephalaria setosa Boiss. & Hohen.
- Cephalaria sparsipilosa V.A.Matthews
- Cephalaria speciosa Boiss. & Kotschy
- Cephalaria squamiflora (Sieber) Greuter
- Cephalaria stapfii Hausskn. ex Bornm.
- Cephalaria stellipilis Boiss.
- Cephalaria sublanata (Bornm.) Szabó
- Cephalaria sumbuliana Göktürk
- Cephalaria syriaca (L.) Roem. & Schult. – Syrian Cephalaria
- Cephalaria szaboi Hayek
- Cephalaria taurica Szabó
- Cephalaria tchihatchewii Boiss.
- Cephalaria tenella Payne ex Boiss.
- Cephalaria torbatejamensis Ranjbar & Z.Ranjbar
- Cephalaria transcaucasica (Bobrov) Galushko
- Cephalaria transsylvanica (L.) Roem. & Schult.
- Cephalaria tuteliana Kuș & Göktürk
- Cephalaria uralensis (Murray) Roem. & Schult.
- Cephalaria velutina Bobrov
- Cephalaria wilmsiana Szabó
- Cephalaria zeyheriana Szabó

== Cultivation and uses ==
Some species are grown as ornamental plants in gardens. The most popular species is C. gigantea, a perennial species from the Caucasus growing to 2 m tall, valued for its strong erect growth with dark green foliage and yellow flowers.

== See also ==
- Flora Europaea: Cephalaria
- Flora of Pakistan: Cephalaria
