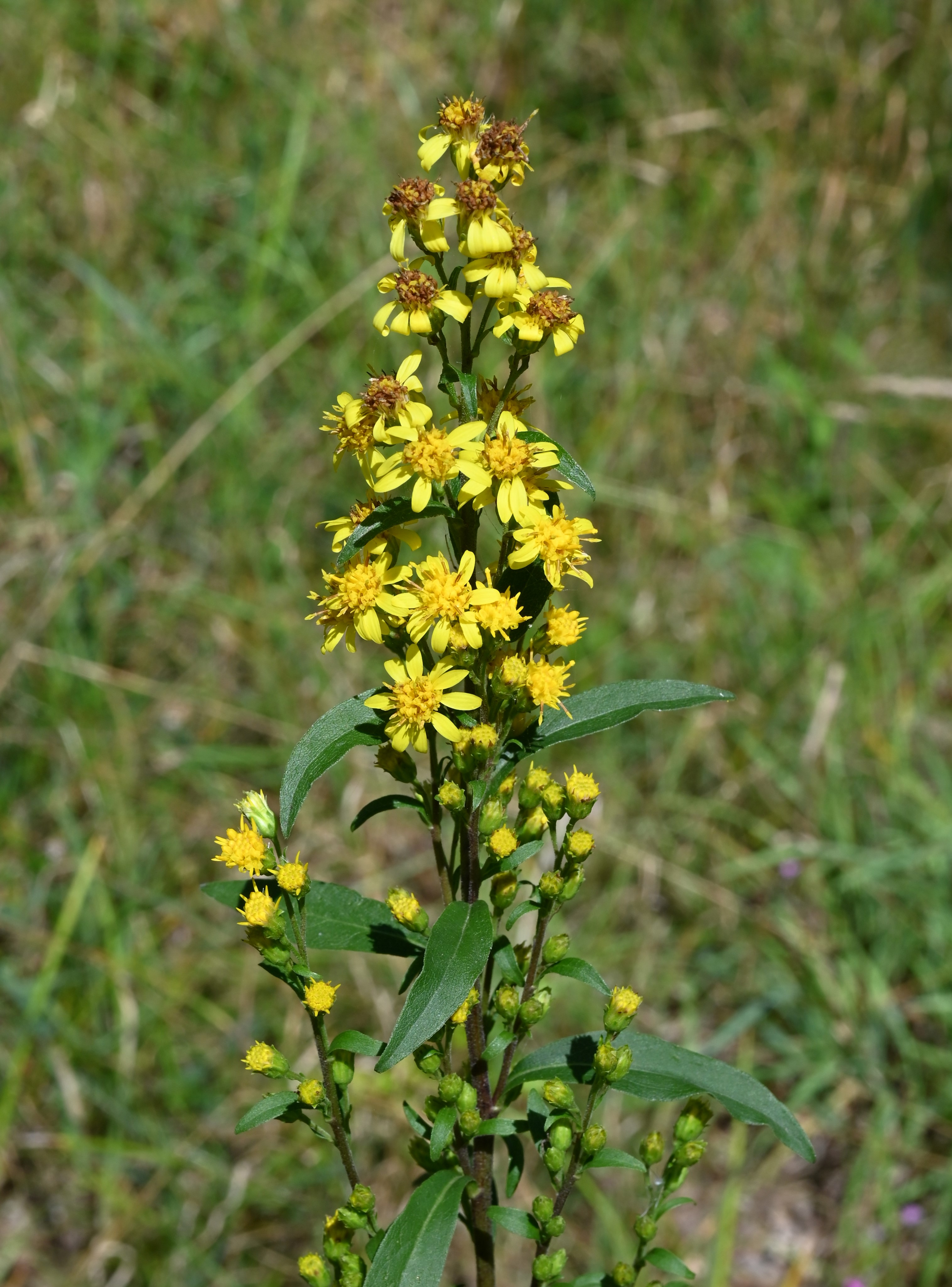

Scientific classification
- Kingdom: Plantae
- Clade: Embryophytes
- Clade: Tracheophytes
- Clade: Angiosperms
- Clade: Eudicots
- Clade: Asterids
- Order: Asterales
- Family: Asteraceae
- Genus: Solidago
- Species: S. virgaurea

Binomial name
- Solidago virgaurea L.

Synonyms
- Synonymy: Aster virgaurea (L.) Kuntze; Dectis decurrens Raf.; Doria virgaurea Scop.; Solidago cantoniensis Lour.; Solidago corsica (Rouy) A.W.Hill; Solidago minor Mill.; Solidago nudiflora Viv.; Solidago pygmaea Bertol.; Solidago vulgaris Lam.; Aster minutus (L.) Kuntze, syn of subsp. alpestris; Solidago armena Kem.-Nath. ex Grossh., syn of subsp. armena; Solidago japonica Kitam., syn of subsp. asiatica; Solidago calcicola (Fernald) Fernald, syn of var. calcicola; Solidago caucasica Kem.-Nath., syn of subsp. caucasica; Solidago dahurica Kitag., syn of subsp. dahurica; Solidago gebleri Juz., syn of subsp. dahurica; Solidago insularis Kitam., syn of subsp. insularis; Solidago jailarum Juz., syn of subsp. jailarum; Solidago lapponica With., syn of subsp. lapponica; Solidago macrorrhiza Lange, syn of subsp. macrorrhiza; Solidago alpestris Waldst. & Kit. ex Willd., syn of subsp. minuta; Solidago cambrica Huds., syn of subsp. minuta; Solidago minuta L., syn of subsp. minuta; Solidago stenophylla (G.E.Schultz) Tzvelev, syn of subsp. stenophylla; Solidago talyschensis Tzvelev, syn of subsp. talyschensis; Solidago taurica Juz., syn of subsp. taurica; Solidago turfosa Woronow ex Grossh., syn of subsp. turfosa

= Solidago virgaurea =

Species of flowering plant

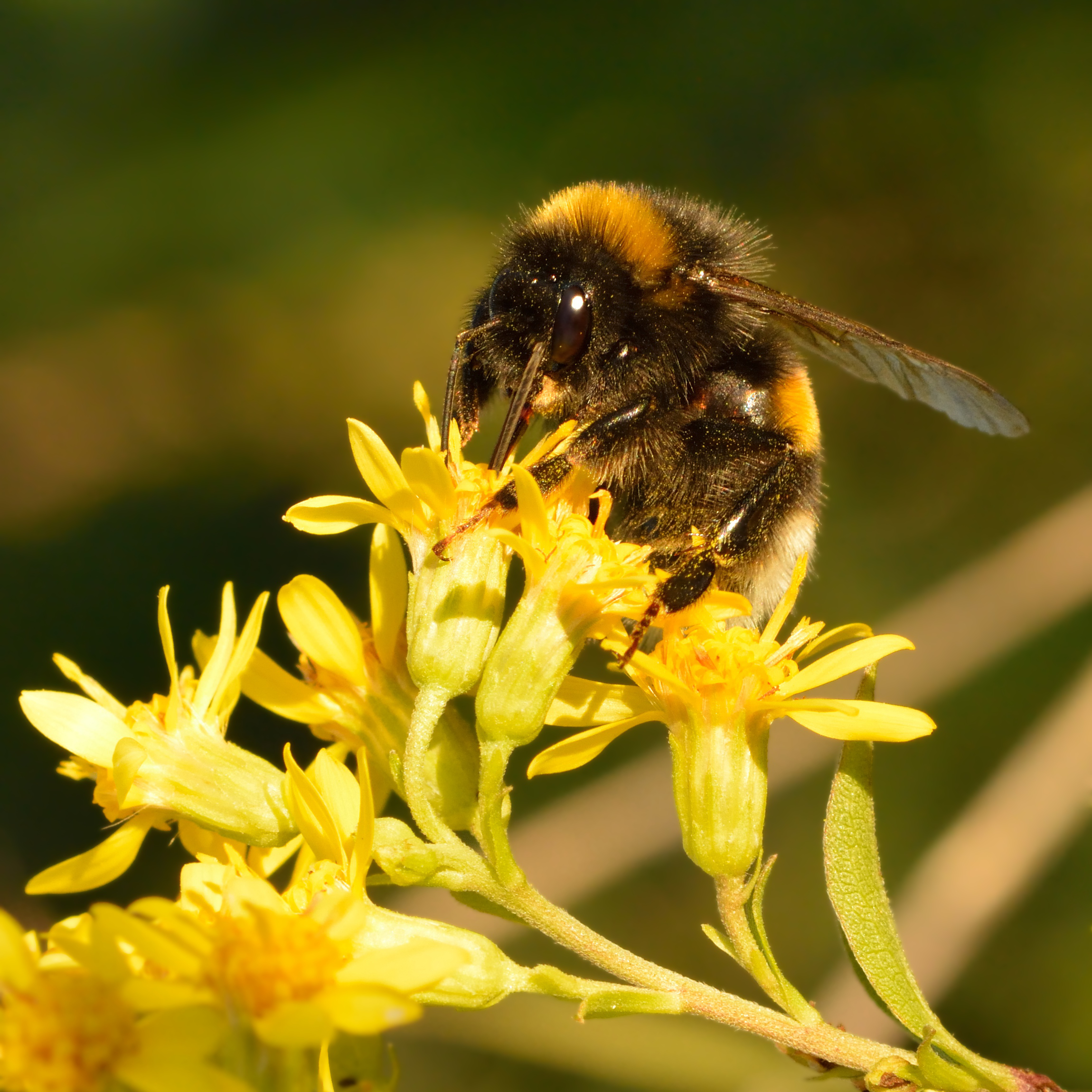
Flowers with Bombus cryptarum

Solidago virgaurea, the European goldenrod or woundwort, is an herbaceous perennial plant of the family Asteraceae. It is widespread across most of Europe as well as North Africa and northern, central, and southwestern Asia (China, Russia, India, Turkey, Kazakhstan, etc.). It is grown as a garden flower with many different cultivars. It flowers profusely in late summer.

Solidago virgaurea is a perennial herb up to 100 cm (40 inches) tall, with a branching underground caudex and a woody rhizome. It produces arrays of numerous small yellow flower heads at the top of the stem.

Subspecies and varieties

- Solidago virgaurea subsp. alpestris (Waldst. & Kit.) Gremli
- Solidago virgaurea subsp. armena (Grossh.) Greuter
- Solidago virgaurea subsp. asiatica Kitam. ex Hara
- Solidago virgaurea var. calcicola Fernald
- Solidago virgaurea subsp. caucasica (Kem.-Nath.) Greuter
- Solidago virgaurea subsp. dahurica (Kitag.) Kitag.
- Solidago virgaurea subsp. gigantea (Nakai) Kitam.
- Solidago virgaurea var. insularis (Kitam.) Hara
- Solidago virgaurea subsp. jailarum (Juz.) Tzvelev
- Solidago virgaurea subsp. lapponica (With.) Tzvelev
- Solidago virgaurea subsp. macrorrhiza (Lange) Nyman
- Solidago virgaurea subsp. minuta (L.) Arcang.
- Solidago virgaurea subsp. stenophylla (G.E.Schultz) Tzvelev
- Solidago virgaurea subsp. talyschensis (Tzvelev) Sennikov
- Solidago virgaurea subsp. taurica (Juz.) Tzvelev
- Solidago virgaurea subsp. turfosa (Woronow ex Grossh.) Greuter
- Solidago virgaurea subsp. virgaurea
- Solidago virgaurea var. virgaurea

== Medicinal uses ==
In the fifteenth and sixteenth centuries Solidago virgaurea was used in Europe to heal wounds. Its astringent, diuretic, antiseptic and other properties are well known. In various assessments by the European Medicines Agency with respect to Solidago virgaurea, non-clinical data show diuretic, anti-inflammatory, antioxidant, analgesic and spasmolytic, antibacterial, and immunomodulatory activity. However, as no single ingredient is responsible for these effects, the whole herbal preparation of Solidago inflorescences must be considered as the active ingredient. Further, the relevance of those effects found in vitro could not be confirmed by clinical studies.
