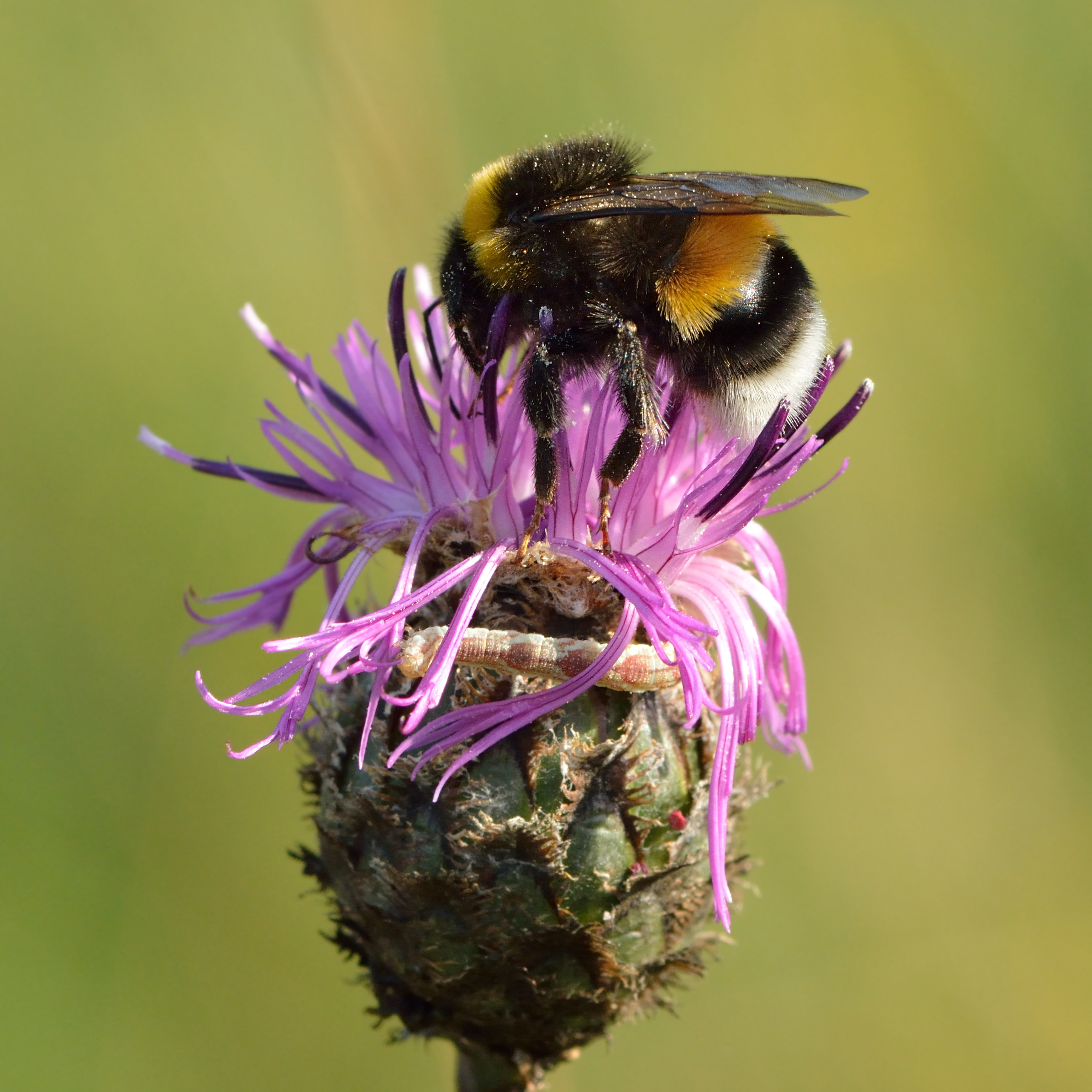

Conservation status
- Least Concern (IUCN 3.1)

Scientific classification
- Kingdom: Animalia
- Phylum: Arthropoda
- Clade: Pancrustacea
- Class: Insecta
- Order: Hymenoptera
- Family: Apidae
- Genus: Bombus
- Subgenus: Bombus
- Species: B. lucorum

Binomial name
- Bombus lucorum (Linnaeus, 1761)

= Bombus lucorum =

White-tailed bumblebee

Species of bee

Bombus lucorum, the white-tailed bumblebee, is a species of bumblebee, widespread and common throughout Europe. This name has been widely used for a range of nearly identical-looking or cryptic species of bumblebees. In 1983, Scholl and Obrecht even coined the term Bombus lucorum complex to explain the three taxa (B. lucorum, Bombus magnus, and Bombus cryptarum) that cannot be easily differentiated from one another by their appearances. A recent review of all of these species worldwide has helped to clarify its distribution in Europe and northern Asia, almost to the Pacific. B. lucorum reaches the Barents Sea in the North. However, in southern Europe, although found in Greece it is an upland species with its distribution never quite reaching the Mediterranean.

Compared to other bumblebee species, the individuals of B. lucorum have shorter tongues, and this characteristic enable them to rob nectar. The worker bee uses the horny sheath around its tongue to make a hole through the flower, reaching the nectar without entering the flower. Therefore, the worker bee does not come in contact with the pollen while getting the nectar.

== Taxonomy and phylogeny ==
Bombus lucorum is part of the order Hymenoptera which consists of ants, bees, wasps, and sawflies, and the family Apidae which comprises bees. It is also part of the genus Bombus which consists of bumblebees, and the subgenus Bombus sensu stricto, which contains five species in Europe: B. terrestris, B. sporadicus, B. lucorum, B. magnus, and B. cryptarum. B. lucorum is closely related to B. terrestris, B. cryptarum, and B. magnus, with only few subtle differences in their morphologies.

== Description and identification ==
=== Queens, males, and workers ===
Bombus lucorum is a large bumblebee, with the queen having a length of 18–22 mm (0.71–0.87 in), a wingspan of around 36 mm (1.4 in), and a weight of 0.46-0.70 g. The workers are smaller than the queens, with a length of 12–18 mm and weight of 0.04-0.32 g. The males are 16-18mm in size and differ more in their appearance from the queens with their yellow noses and larger amounts of yellow hairs. The species has a short proboscis. The predominant color is black, with a pale yellow collar, a yellow band on the second tergite (abdominal segment), and a white tail. Both darker and paler forms exist. The males vary in color more than the females. The darker males are mostly found in northernmost Fennoscandia, southwestern Norway, and on the island of Gotland in the Baltic.

=== Nests ===
The nests of B. lucorum can be found underground and may be very large, containing up to 400 workers. Often, they are abandoned nests of old mice or vole. In the nest, the queen makes a circular chamber where she builds a wax egg cell in which she lays her first batch of eggs. The eggs are laid on a layer of pollen and then covered again with a wax layer.

In the United Kingdom, where the species is very common, they prefer to have their nests facing south for extra warmth.

== Distribution and habitat ==
Bombus lucorum is distributed widely and can be found in the Palearctic (including Japan), Oriental, Arctic, and western Nearctic realms. It is more common in more northern parts. It also can be found in Iceland, where it was probably introduced by humans, and Britain. Its habitats include coastal, farmland, grassland, heathland, towns, gardens, upland, and woodland edges. The species can be found almost anywhere where there are flowers for food.

== Colony ==
Bombus lucorum is one of the first species of bumblebees to emerge from hibernation. The hibernating queen emerges as early as February, but in southern Britain, they usually emerge in March. They usually can be found flying near the ground, looking for holes that are suitable for their new nests. They will also forage on flowers to create reserves for their new nests. They will have pollen loads on their hindlegs when they are ready to establish a colony. The workers start to emerge sometime between late March and mid May. A colony can have as many as 400 workers. The males emerge later, starting in August. As in many other bumblebee species, the males fly in a low patrolling circuit, depositing pheromones on grass to attract young queens. The new queens mate with these males, and when the old queen and the males die in Autumn, they hibernate to start the colony cycle again the next spring

== Mating ==
=== Female/male interactions ===
During their pre-mating behavior, males scent-mark prominent objects in their flight paths with a species-specific sex pheromone. Then, they fly along these paths, showing patrolling behavior, in order to mate with females that come to the path due to their attraction to the pheromone.

=== Pheromones ===
Males produce pheromones in the cephalic part of the labial gland, and they mark objects in their flight paths with the volatile components of the gland secretion. This secretion is a complex mixture of sixty compounds of which 53% is ethyl (z)-tetradec-9-enoate, ethyl esters of fatty acids. Other components include ethyl dodecanoate (6%), ethyl tetradecanoate (2%), ethyl (Z)-hexadec-9-enoate (4%), ethyl (Z)-octadec-9-enoate (2%), hexadecan-1-ol (4%), (Z,Z,Z)-octadeca-9,12,15-trien-1-ol (1%), and (Z)-hexadec-7-enal (2%). The biosynthetic pathway of the pheromones is not well known, but it was suggested that they are produced from common lipids in the body. Young and old males of B. lucorum have similar quantities of labial gland secretions because the secretory activity continues throughout their lifetime with no dependence on age.

== Relatedness to other species ==
=== Bombus lucorum complex ===
The term "Bombus lucorum complex" was coined by Scholl and Obrecht in 1983 to explain the complex of three taxa (B. lucorum, Bombus magnus, and Bombus cryptarum) that cannot be easily differentiated from one another by their morphological characteristics. However, they can be distinguished using mitochondrial gene sequences and male pheromones. For example, B. lucorum can be identified by its main substance of the male labial gland secretion called ethyl tetradec-9-enoate.

==== Bombus magnus ====
Bombus magnus queens are bigger than B. lucorum queens in their size. Also, the size of their yellow collar on thorax are larger than those of B. lucorum queens. However, the workers of the two species are basically indistinguishable.

==== Bombus cryptarum ====
Similar to B. magnus, the yellow collar of B. cryptarum extends further below the wing than that of B. lucorum. Also, it has a thin S-shaped line of black hairs through its yellow collar. In addition, the queens of B. cryptarum emerge before B. magnus or B. lucorum during the colony initiation.

=== Bombus terrestris ===
Bombus lucorum was separated from B. terrestris in the beginning of the 20th century because of their morphological differences, male labial gland secretions, and mitochondrial DNA markers. While the workers of B. terrestris and B. lucorum are basically indistinguishable by their appearances as the queens of the two species have few identifiable differences in their morphologies. At the end of the abdomen, B. terrestris queens have orange hairs while those of B. lucorum have white hairs, from which their common name originated. Also, the yellow thorax hairs of B. terrestris have a tint of dull orange while those of B. lucorum are more lemon yellow in color. The width of the collar in B. terrestris workers is narrower than that in B. lucorum workers, and B. terrestris have very small dots in the ocellus-orbital-area and in the surface structure of the second tergite rim. However, all these morphological differences are too subtle to be reliable in differentiating between the two species, and only by using their genetic characteristics can they be identified reliably.

=== Chinese Bombus lucorum ===
A species of bumblebees called B. lucorum in China is not the same species as B. lucorum in Europe. The labial gland secretions of male bumblebees can be divided into two different types according to the biochemical pathways that synthesize the compounds. The two types are PP type secretions that contain only fatty acid derivatives and PP + MAP type secretions that contain fatty acid derivatives and mevalonic acid derivatives in the form of acyclic diterpenes. It was found that the European B. lucorum contains PP type secretions while Chinese B. lucorum contains PP + MAP type secretions. They would be very difficult to tell apart solely on their morphological characteristics but they can be identified according to the different types of male labial gland secretions.

== Interaction with other species ==
=== Parasites ===
B. bohemicus is a species of cuckoo bee that lay eggs in the nest of a host species. B. lucorum often become the host for B. bohemicus, and because B. lucorum is fairly common in Europe, B. bohemicus also does well there.

=== Diet ===
After the queens emerge from their hibernation, they forage on flowers including crocus, Erica, Mahonia, white and red deadnettles, Prunus, flowering currant and bluebells. However, the bees forage on many other flowers, including many garden plants, such as lavender, Hebe, Rhododendron, deadnettles, thistles, and vetches, as well as ceanothus, wall flower, campanula, privet, sage, Hypericum, bramble, red bartsia, clovers, lupins, honeysuckle, sedum, knapweed, Buddleia, viper's bugloss, and trefoils, and comfrey.

==== Nectar robbing ====
Compared to other bumblebee species, the individuals of B. lucorum have short tongues. Therefore, they tend to forage on flowers with short corollas and daisy-type flowers. However, because of their shorter tongues, they also developed a method of "robbing nectar." To rob nectar, the worker uses the horny sheath around its tongue to make a hole through the flower. Then, it will reach the nectar without entering the flower. By getting the nectar this way, the worker bee does not come in contact with the pollen and thus does not pollinate the flower. The flower is not only "robbed" of its nectar but also left with a hole for other insects to reach nectar as a result.
