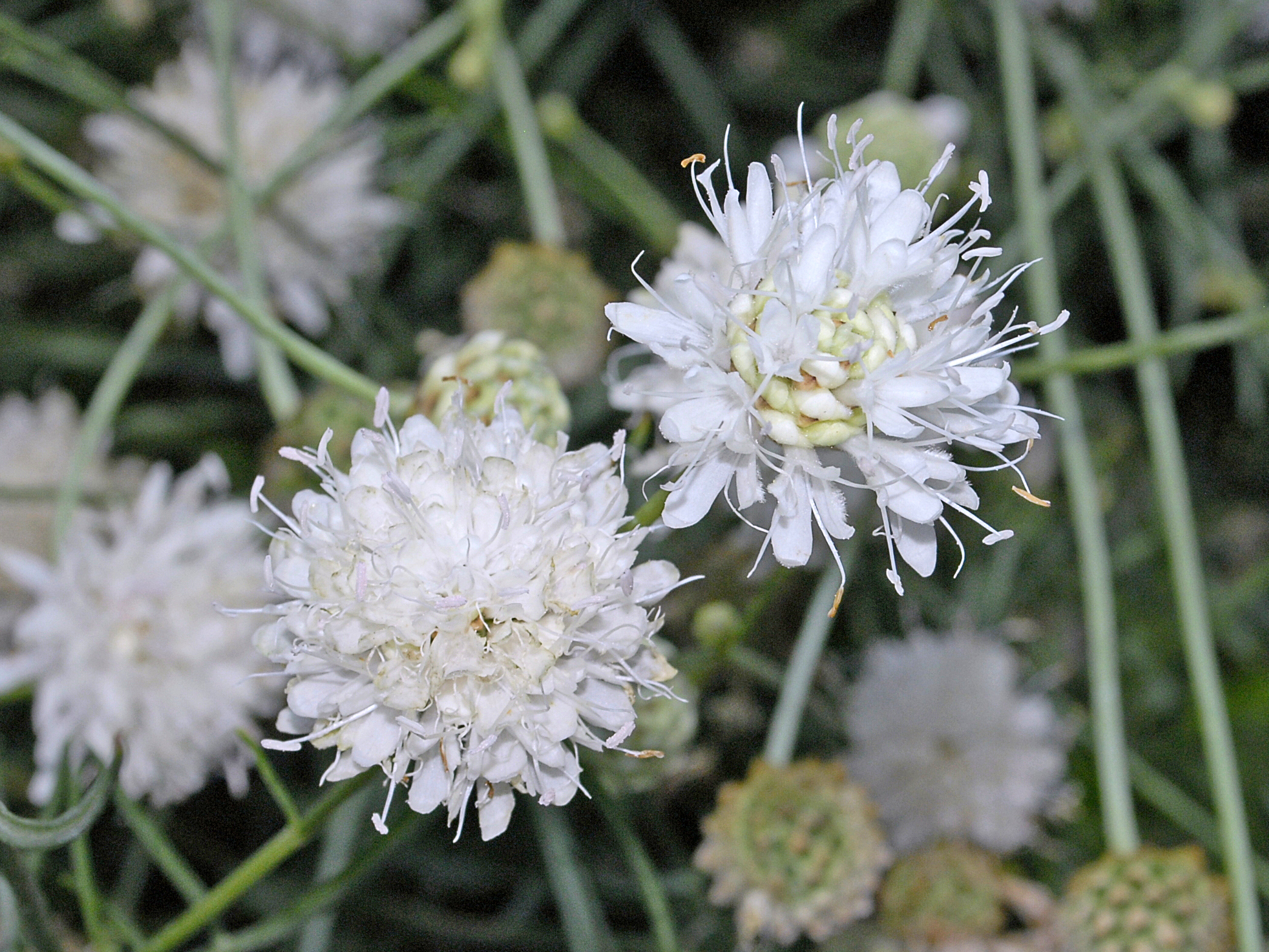
- Flowers of Cephalaria leucantha at the Civico Orto Botanico di Trieste

Scientific classification
- Kingdom: Plantae
- Clade: Embryophytes
- Clade: Tracheophytes
- Clade: Angiosperms
- Clade: Eudicots
- Clade: Asterids
- Order: Dipsacales
- Family: Caprifoliaceae
- Genus: Cephalaria
- Species: C. leucantha

Binomial name
- Cephalaria leucantha (L.) Schrad. ex Roem. & Schult

Synonyms
- Cephalaria albescens (Willd.) Roem. & Schult.; Cephalaria boetica Boiss.; Cephalaria leucanthema Roem. & Schult.; Cephalaria linearifolia Lange; Cerionanthus leucanthus Schott ex Roem. & Schult.; Scabiosa leucantha L.

= Cephalaria leucantha =

Species of flowering plant in the honeysuckle family

Cephalaria leucantha is a species of flowering plants in the family Caprifoliaceae.

== Description ==
Cephalaria leucantha grows to 90–150 centimetres (35–59 in) in height. This hardy perennial plant has a long stem with divided, fern-like leaves. It produces white or pale lemon flowers from July to November.

== Distribution ==
This species is present in northern Africa and in southern Europe (Albania, former Yugoslavia, Greece, Italy, France, Portugal, and Spain).

== History ==
The species was described as Scabiosa trenta by Belsazar Hacquet in 1782. This resulted in a century-long search by other botanists to find the new species that Hacquet had described in the Julian Alps. It was not until 1893 that the Austrian botanist Anton Kerner von Marilaun determined that Hacquet's species was actually Cephalaria leucantha, which is now extinct in the Julian Alps.
