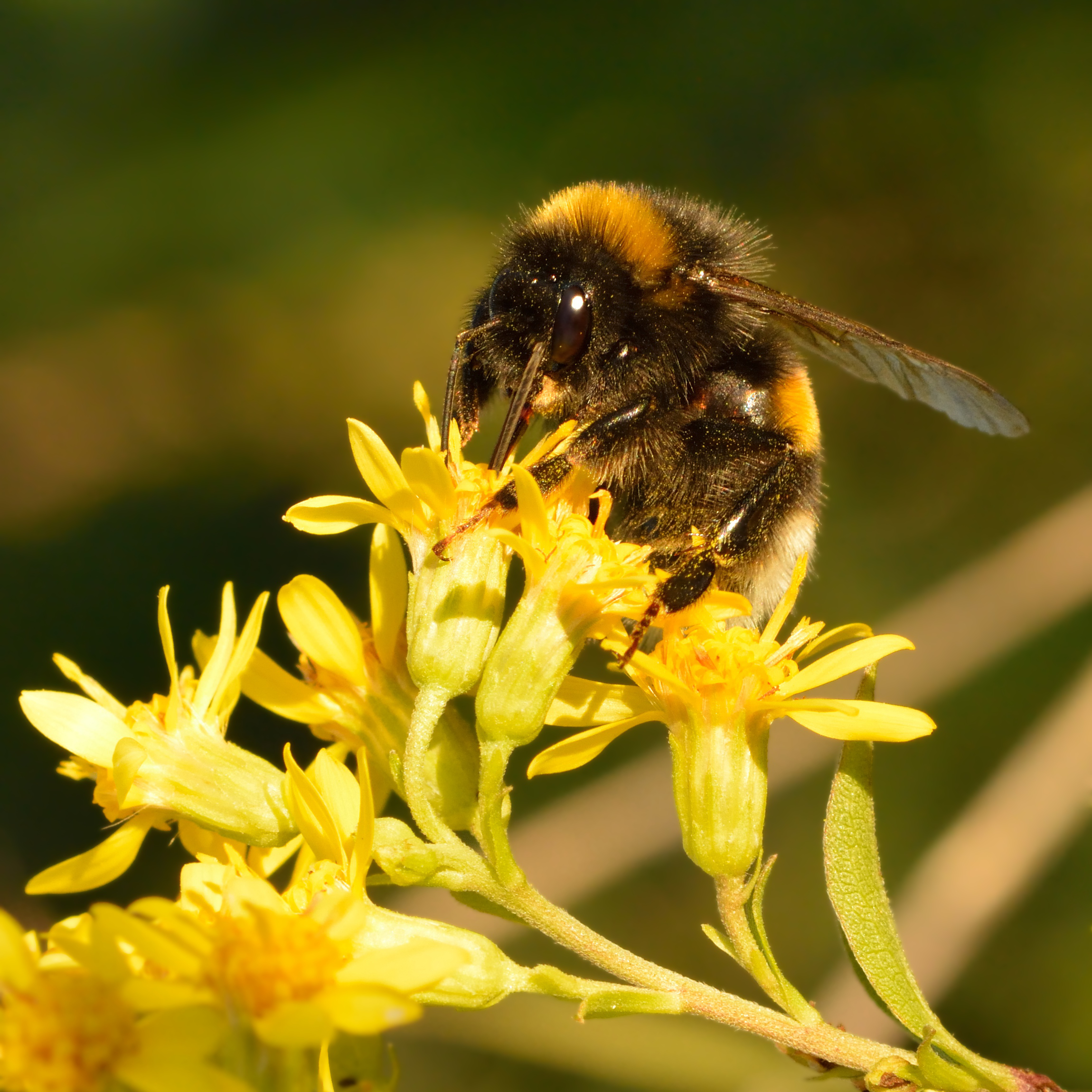

Conservation status
- Data Deficient (IUCN 3.1)

- Secure (NatureServe)

Scientific classification
- Kingdom: Animalia
- Phylum: Arthropoda
- Class: Insecta
- Order: Hymenoptera
- Family: Apidae
- Genus: Bombus
- Species: B. cryptarum

Binomial name
- Bombus cryptarum (Fabricius, 1775)

= Bombus cryptarum =

Species of bee

Bombus cryptarum is a species of bumblebee. It is native to the northern hemisphere, where it is "one of the most widespread bumblebees in the world." It occurs throughout Europe, Asia, and western North America. It is known commonly as the cryptic bumblebee.

The complete distribution of the species is unclear due to taxonomic uncertainties. It is part of a species complex of several bees in the subgenus Bombus sensu stricto, which are very similar and difficult to tell apart.

It has only recently been identified in the British Isles.

Bombus cryptarum differs from Bombus magnus phylogenetically and in labial gland secretions. Bombus cryptarum florilegus, an endangered subspecies in Japan, had previously been identified as having a close relationship with Bombus lucorum. Bombus cryptarum florilegus was found to have low genetic diversity in Japan and maintained their own population with immigration from Notsuke Peninsula to the Chishima (Kuril) Islands

In northern areas this bee lives on plains, especially in heather ecosystems. In southern regions it can be found in mountain habitat.
