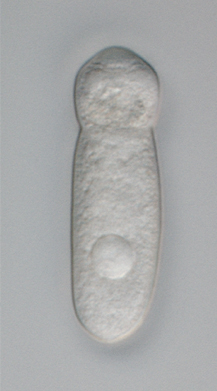
- A live specimen of a septate (or cephaline) gregarine showing the distinctive "head"-like section of the trophozoite containing the epimerite at its anterior end. Septate gregarines are intestinal parasites of arthropods.

Scientific classification
- Domain: Eukaryota
- Clade: Sar
- Clade: Alveolata
- Phylum: Apicomplexa
- Class: Conoidasida
- Subclass: Gregarinasina

Orders
- Archigregarinorida; Eugregarinorida; Neogregarinorida

Synonyms
- Gregarinia

= Gregarinasina =

Subclass of protists

The gregarines are a group of Apicomplexan alveolates, classified as the Gregarinasina, Gregarinea or Gregarinia. The large (roughly half a millimeter) parasites inhabit the intestines of many invertebrates. They are not found in any vertebrates. Gregarines are closely related to both Toxoplasma and Plasmodium, which cause toxoplasmosis and malaria, respectively. Both protists use protein complexes similar to those that are formed by the gregarines for gliding motility and for invading target cells. This makes the gregarines excellent models for studying gliding motility, with the goal of developing treatment options for both toxoplasmosis and malaria. Thousands of different species of gregarine are expected to be found in insects, and 99% of these gregarine species still need to be described. Each insect species can be the host of multiple gregarine species. One of the most-studied gregarines is Gregarina garnhami. In general, gregarines are regarded as a very successful group of parasites, as their hosts are distributed over the entire planet.

== Life cycle ==
Gregarines occur in both aquatic and terrestrial environments. Although they are usually transmitted by the orofaecal route, some are transmitted with the host's gametes during copulation, e.g., Monocystis.

In all species, four or more sporozoites (depending on the species), equipped with an apical complex, escape from the oocysts in a process called excystation. They find their way to the appropriate body cavity, and penetrate host cells in their immediate environment. The sporozoites begin to feed within the host cell and develop into larger trophozoites. In some species, the sporozoites and trophozoites are capable of asexual replication – a process called schizogony or merogony.

In all species, two mature trophozoites eventually pair up in a process known as syzygy and develop into gamonts. During syzygy, gamont orientation differs between species (side-to-side, head-to-tail). A gametocyst wall forms around each gamont pair, which then begins to divide into hundreds of gametes. Zygotes are produced by the fusion of two gametes, and these, in turn, become surrounded by an oocyst wall. Within the oocyst, meiosis occurs, yielding the sporozoites. Hundreds of oocysts accumulate within each gametocyst; these are released via a host's faeces or via host death and decay.

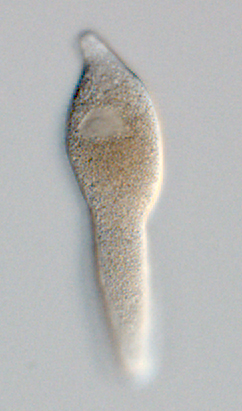
Lankesteria cystodytae is an intestinal parasite of ascidians. These aseptate gregarines lack epimerites and instead possess attachment organelles known as mucrons

Gregarines have thus far been reported to infect over 3000 invertebrate species.

== Taxonomy ==
The gregarines were recognised as a taxon by Grasse in 1953. The three orders into which they are currently divided were created by Levine et al. in 1980.

Currently, about 250 genera and 1650 species are known in this taxon. They are divided into three orders based on habitat, host range, and trophozoite morphology.

Most species have monoxenous lifecycles involving a single invertebrate host. In the lifecycle, the extracellular feeding stage is known as the trophozoite.

=== Main divisions ===
Archigregarines are found only in marine habitats. They possess intestinal trophozoites similar in morphology to the infective sporozoites. Phylogenetic analysis suggests this group is paraphyletic and will need division. Generally, four zoites are in each spore in this group.

Eugregarines are found in marine, freshwater, and terrestrial habitats. These species possess large trophozoites that are significantly different in morphology and behavior from the sporozoites. This taxon contains most of the known gregarine species. The intestinal eugregarines are separated into septate – suborder Septatorina – and aseptate – suborder Aseptatorina – depending on whether the trophozoite is superficially divided by a transverse septum. The aseptate species are mostly marine gregarines.

Urosporidians are aseptate eugregarines that infect the coelomic spaces of marine hosts. Unusually, they tend to lack attachment structures and form gamont pairs that pulsate freely within the coelomic fluid.

Monocystids are aseptate eugregarines that infect the reproductive vesicles of terrestrial annelids. These latter species tend to branch closely with neogregarines and may need to be reclassified. Generally, eight zoites are in each spore in this group.

Neogregarines are found only in terrestrial hosts. These species have reduced trophozoites and tend to infect tissues other than the intestine. Usually, eight zoites are in each spore in this group.

The eugregarines and neogregarines differ in a number of respects. The neogregarines are in general more pathogenic to their hosts. The eugregarines multiply by sporogony and gametogony, while the neogregarines have an additional schizogenic stage – merogony – within their hosts. Merogony may be intracellular or extracellular depending on the species.

DNA studies suggest the archigregarines are ancestral to the others.

=== Proposed revisions ===
Cavalier-Smith has proposed a significant revision of this taxon assuming the polyphyly of eugregarines. He has separated gregarines into three classes. The first of them – Gregarinomorphea – comprises Orthogregarinia, Cryptosporidiidae and, additionally, Rhytidocystidae previously considered as divergent coccidians or Apicomplexa incertae sedis. The Orthogregarinia with two new orders Arthrogregarida and Vermigregarida was created for the gregarines most closely related to Cryptosporidium. The second class – Paragregarea – was created for the archigregarines, Stenophorida and a new order – Velocida which itself was created for Urosporoidea superfam. n. and Veloxidium. The third class was created – Squirmida – for Filipodium and Platyproteum. Thus, the eugregarines proved to be split and distributed among these three classes together with some other apicomplexans.

This point of view was challenged in 2017 by Simdyanov and co-authors, who performed the global integrated analysis of available morphological and molecular phylogenetic data and concluded that eugregarines are rather a monophyletic taxon.

Several genera of gregarines are currently not classified: Acuta, Cephalolobus, Gregarina, Levinea, Menospora, Nematocystis, Nematopsis, Steinina, and Trichorhynchus.

== Characteristics ==
- Meiosis occurs in all species.
- Monoxenous – only one host occurs in lifecycle for almost all species.
- Mitochondria have tubular cristae and are often distributed near the cell periphery.
- Apical complex occurs in the sporozoite stage, but is lost in the trophozoite stage in eugregarines and neogregarines.
- Trophozoites have a large and conspicuous nucleus and nucleolus.
- They inhabit extracellular body cavities of invertebrates such as the intestines, coeloms, and reproductive vesicles.
- Attachment to host occurs by a mucron (aseptate gregarines) or an epimerite (septate gregarines); some gregarines (urosporidians) float freely within extracellular body cavities (coelom).

The parasites are relatively large, spindle-shaped cells, compared to other apicomplexans and eukaryotes in general (some species are > 850 µm in length). Most gregarines have longitudinal epicytic folds (bundles of microtubules beneath the cell surface with nematode like bending behaviour): crenulations are instead found in the urosporidians.

== Molecular biology ==
The gregarines are able to move and change direction along a surface through gliding motility without the use of cilia, flagella, or lamellipodia. This is accomplished through the use of an actin and myosin complex. The complexes require an actin cytoskeleton to perform their gliding motions. In the proposed 'capping' model, an uncharacterized protein complex moves rearward, moving the parasites forward.

== History ==
The gregarines are among the oldest known parasites, having been described by the physician Francesco Redi in 1684.

The first formal description was made by Dufour in 1828. He created the genus Gregarina, named for their gregarious nature (Note: “…which expresses the habit these intestinal worms have of living in herds.” (French: “…que exprime l'habitude qu'ont ces vers intestinaux de vivre en troupeaux.”)), and described Gregarina ovata from Folficula aricularia. He considered them to be parasitic worms. Kölliker recognised them as protozoa in 1848.
