= Machadoella =

Scientific classification
- Domain: Eukaryota
- Clade: Sar
- Superphylum: Alveolata
- Phylum: Apicomplexa
- Class: Conoidasida
- Order: Neogregarinorida
- Family: Schizocystidae
- Genus: Machadoella; Reichenow, 1934

Species
- Machadoella spinigeri Machadoella triatomae

Genus of single-celled organisms

Machadoella is a genus of parasitic alveolates in the phylum Apicomplexa.

Species in this genus infect species of the family Reduviidae.

== History ==
This genus was described by Reichenow in 1935.

The type species - Machadoella spinigeri - was first described by Machado in 1913.

== Taxonomy ==
Two species are currently recognised in this genus.

== Lifecycle ==
The species in this genus develop in the Malphigian tubules of their host.

The trophozoites are worm like with longitudinal folds.

The schizonts are globular with multiple nuclei.

The gamonts are elongated and slightly swollen at the level of the nucleus.

Syzygy occurs at the anterior end of the gamonts.

The gametes are similar in size (isogamy).

The spores are fusiform (lemon shaped).
