= Archigregarinorida =

Scientific classification
- Domain: Eukaryota
- Clade: Sar
- Superphylum: Alveolata
- Phylum: Apicomplexa
- Class: Conoidasida
- Subclass: Gregarinasina
- Order: Archigregarinorida; Grassé & Schrével 1953

Families
- Exoschizonidae; Selenidioididae

Order of single-celled organisms

The Archigregarinorida are an order of parasitic alveolates in the phylum Apicomplexa. Species in this order infect marine invertebrates — usually annelids, ascidians, hemichordates and sipunculids.

== Taxonomy ==
This order was redefined by Levine in 1971.

The order currently consists of 76 species in two families — Exoschizonidae and Selenidioididae.

The family Exoschizonidae contains one genus — Exoschizon — which has one species.

The family Selenidioididae has six genera: Filipodium with 3 species, Merogregarina with one species, Meroselenidium with one species, Platyproteum with one species, Selenidioides with 11 species and Veloxidium with one species.

== Phylogenetics ==
DNA studies suggest that the archigregarines are ancestral to the other gregarines. Phylogenetic analysis suggests that this group is paraphyletic and will need division. The Neogregarinorida appear to be derived from the Eugregarinorida.

Assuming this is correct the evolutionary order appears to be: the Archigregarinorida gave rise to the Eugregarinorida who in turn gave rise to the Neogregarinorida.

Morrison using molecular data has shown that the Haemosporidia appear to nest within the gregarines.

== Description ==
The species in this order are relatively large spindle shaped cells, compared to other apicomplexans and eukaryotes in general (some species are > 850 µm in length). Most gregarines have longitudinal epicytic folds (bundles of microtubules beneath the cell surface with nematode like bending behaviour).

- Syzygy occurs in all species
- Monoxenous — only one host in life cycle
- Mitochondria have tubular cristae and are often distributed near the cell periphery
- Apical complex is present in both the sporozoite and trophozoite stages
- Trophozoites have a large and conspicuous nucleus and nucleolus
- Inhabit extracellular body cavities of invertebrates such as the intestines, coeloms and reproductive vesicles
- Attachment to host via a mucron (aseptate gregarines) or an epimerite (septate gregarines)
- Possess longitudinal epicytic folds
- Have a myzocytosis-based mode of feeding

== Life cycle ==
Archigregarines are found only in marine habitats and are transmitted by the orofaecal route. Merogony, gamogony and sporogony are thought to occur in all species in this taxon.

In all species four or more sporozoites (the precise number depends on the species) equipped with an apical complex escape from the oocysts, find their way to the appropriate body cavity and penetrate host cells in their immediate environment. The sporozoites emerge within the host cell, begin to feed and develop into larger trophozoites. In some species, the sporozoites and trophozoites are capable of asexual replication — a process called schizogony or merogony. Most species however appear to lack schizogony in their lifecycles.

The intestinal trophozoites are similar in morphology to the infective sporozoites. In all species two mature trophozoites eventually pair up in a process known as syzygy and develop into gamonts. The gamonts are aseptate. During syzygy gamont orientation differs between species (side to side, head to tail). A gametocyst wall forms around each pair of gamonts which then begin to divide into hundreds of gametes. Zygotes are produced by the fusion of two gametes and these in turn become surrounded by an oocyst wall. Within the oocyst meiosis occurs yielding the sporozoites. Hundreds of oocysts accumulate within each gametocyst and these are released via host's faeces or via host death and decay.
