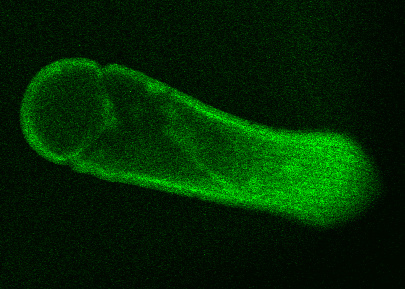
- Autofluorescence of Gregarina garnhami

Scientific classification
- Domain: Eukaryota
- (unranked): SAR
- (unranked): Alveolata
- Phylum: Apicomplexa
- Class: Conoidasida
- Order: Eugregarinorida
- Family: Gregarinidae
- Genus: Gregarina
- Species: G. garnhami

Binomial name
- Gregarina garnhami Canning, 1956

= Gregarina garnhami =

Insect-parasitic micro-organism

Gregarina garnhami is a eukaryotic unicellular organism belonging to the Apicomplexa described in 1956 by Canning as a parasite found in several locusts, such as the desert locust, African migratory locust, and Egyptian locust. Especially, the desert locust is the host for this species, as up to 100% of animals can become infected. An estimated thousands of different species of gregarines can be in insects and 99% of these gregarines still need to be described. Each insect is said to host multiple species. A remarkable feature of G. garnhami is its autofluorescence.

== Taxonomy ==
Gregarina garnhami was considered by Lipa et al. in 1996 to be synonymous with Gregarina acridiorum (Léger, 1893), a parasite of several orthopteran species including Locusta migratoria. Indeed, G. acridiorum and G. garnhami share common morphological and behavioral characteristics, such as their development in the midgut of their hosts, a small globular epimerite, stout bodied gamonts, and barrel-shaped (or dolioform) oocysts. In 2021, an integrative taxonomy study, using morphological and molecular characters, concluded that the two species were distinct and thus confirmed the validity of G. garnhami. However, phenotypic plasticity was clearly observed in the case of G. garnhami: the morphology of its trophozoites, gamonts and syzygies varied according to the geographical location of S. gregaria and the subspecies infected.

== Cell structure ==
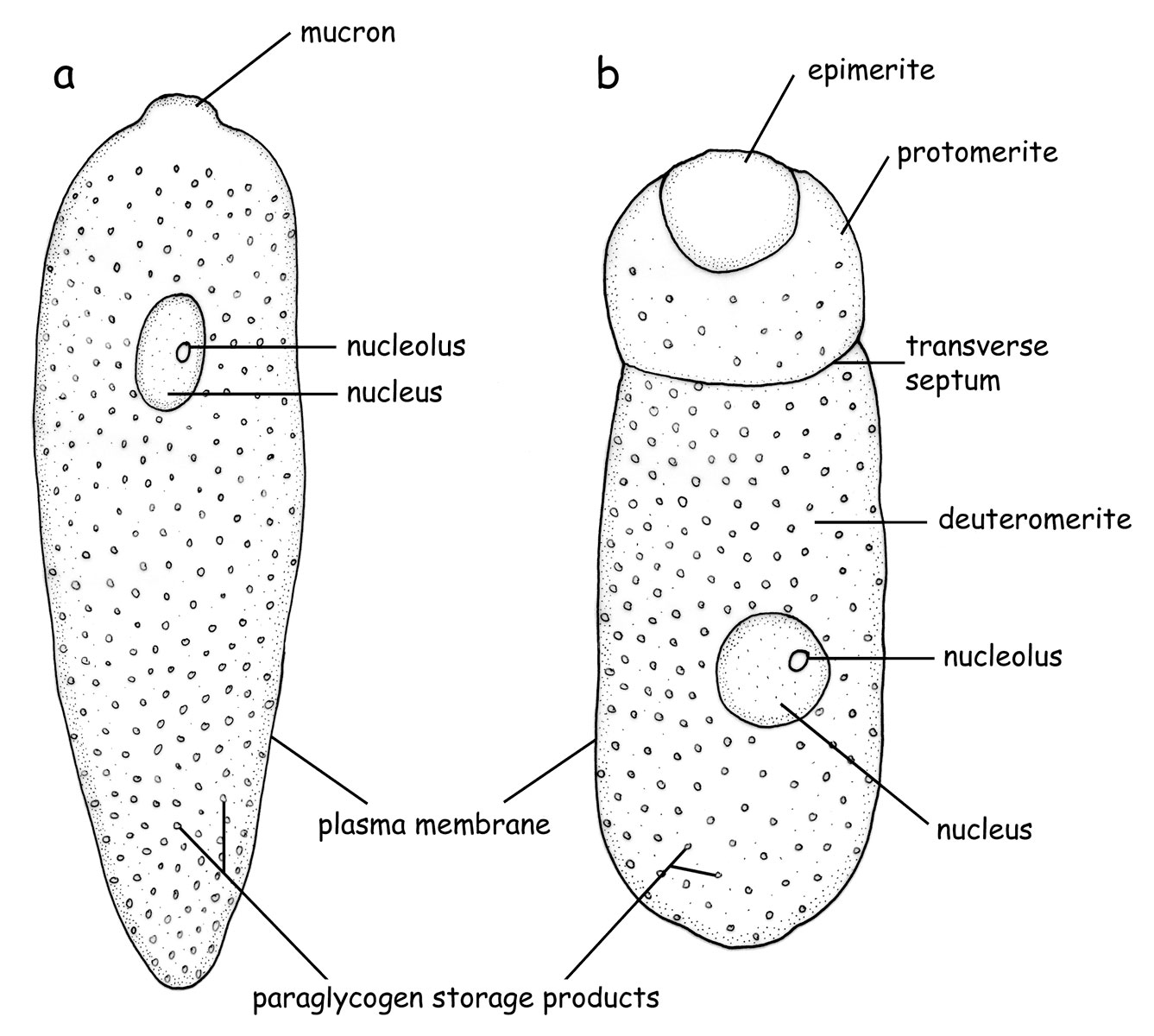
Structure of a septate (right) and aseptate (left) eugregarine

Gregarina garnhami is a gregarine that belongs to the septate eugregarines, meaning its cell is separated into parts. In G. garnhami, three parts can be seen: epimerite, protomerite, and deutomerite, but their visibility depends on the lifestage of the organism. A characteristic of gregarines is the typical construction of the pellicula that is formed by a cell membrane and two cytoplasmic membranes (the latter is often referred to as the inner membrane complex, IMC or alveoli). The membranes' proximity to one another often makes them difficult to distinguish. This structure is often also referred to as the trilayered structure. Beneath the inner membrane, a basal (internal) lamina can be seen, which separates the foldings around the cell from the rest of the cell. These foldings form the outer surface of G. garnhami, and hundreds of these can be observed at the surface enlarging the surface of the cell. The cytoplasm of the cell (in the epimerite, protomerite, and deutomerite) is divided in two zones: ectoplasm and endoplasm. The ectoplasm is clear and does not contain much granular material. In the ectoplasm, the microtubules can be found. The endoplasm is less transparent and contains paraglycogen giving the cells a brown-yellowish color when viewing the cells with a light miscrope.

== Life cycle ==
The lifecycle consists of several stadia: gametocyst - oocyst - sporozoite – trophozoite (chepaline) - gamont (gametocyte, sporadin) – gametocyst – oocyst. The gametocyst and oocysts are the cell structures that can survive outside the host-organism and infect other insects. The cycle starts with the oocysts that leave the body with the feces and are left on plant-material. When other locust than eat the plant with oocysts they will burst open (excystation) under the influence of the digestion of the locust. Eight sporozoites will then be released inside the digestive system of the locust. Orthoptera regurgitate enzymes from the foregut and together with secretions of the salivary glands these enzymes can break down the oocyst cell wall and thus enable the freeing of the sporozoites. The free sporozoits than pass through the peritrophic membrane surrounding the midgut. Once in the ectoperitrophic space they can attach themselves to the epithelial cells of the caeca and midgut.

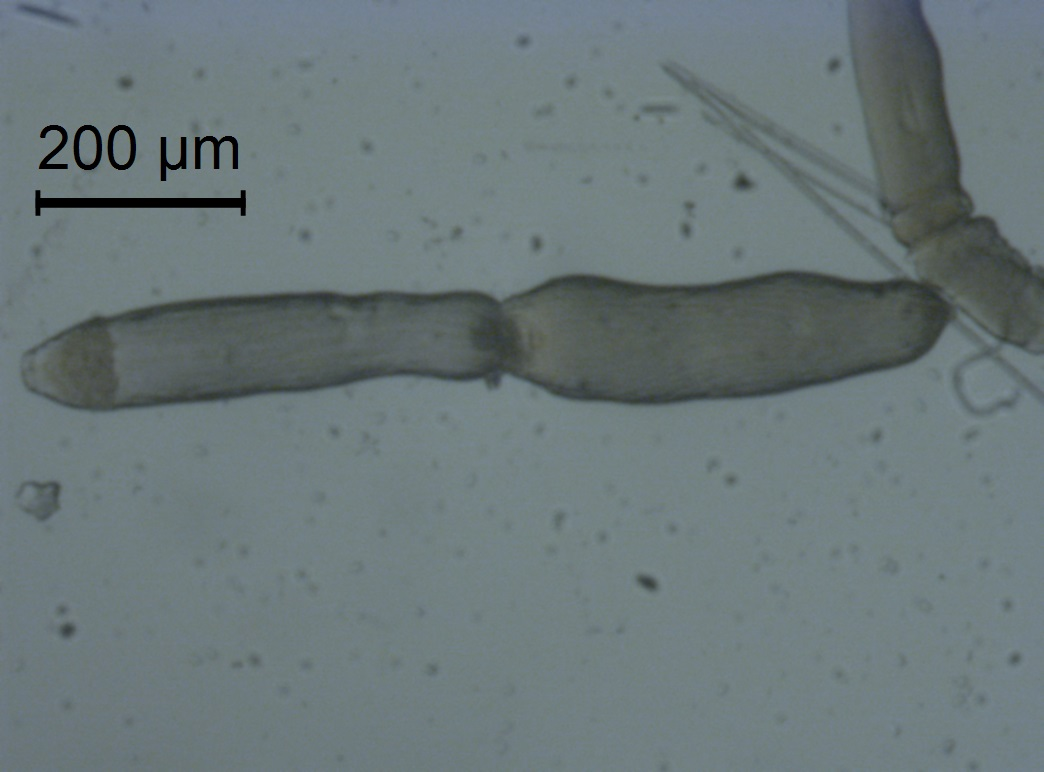
Two trophozoites attaching to each other to form a gamont

Once attached to an epithelial cell, it grows vegetatively and becomes a trophozoite (also called cephalin or chepalont). After 48 hours, a cell with two structures can be seen: the epimerite, attaching to the host cell and the second part (back) of the cell. After a while, a septum is formed, creating a clear protomerite and deuteromerite. After about eight days the Trophozoite will release itself from the host cell. After release from the epithelial cell, a trophozoite associates with a second one and forms a gamont by forming a circle and fusing together (syzygy). Once no distinction between the two is visible, zygotes are formed. The zygotes are the only diploid lifestage in the lifecycle of G. garnhami. A cyst (oocyst) eventually is formed and the nucleus goes through a meiotic and mitotic division. In the end, eight haploid sporozoits are formed, ready to be released into a new host.

== Relationship with their host ==
Their relationship with their hosts has not been deciphered in full detail, but G. garnhami is generally regarded as a commensal organism that does not harm its host. A typical characteristic is that most eugregarines only have one host during their development. This relationship is generally described as host-specific, but this can also be due to the lack of research on this topic. This host-specificity is set to take place at the level of a specific family of hosts in the case of Orthoptera hosts. Although some studies mention more hosts per species of gregarine. Lifestage specificity has been shown and this is mainly important for holometabolic insects. Due to a lack of genetic information on gregarines it is however difficult to study the host-specificity. The identification of gregarines is often based on external characteristics, but they are very similar making identification difficult. In the past (and as of 2020) identification of gregarines was often based on the host, but this seems not to be an advisable method.

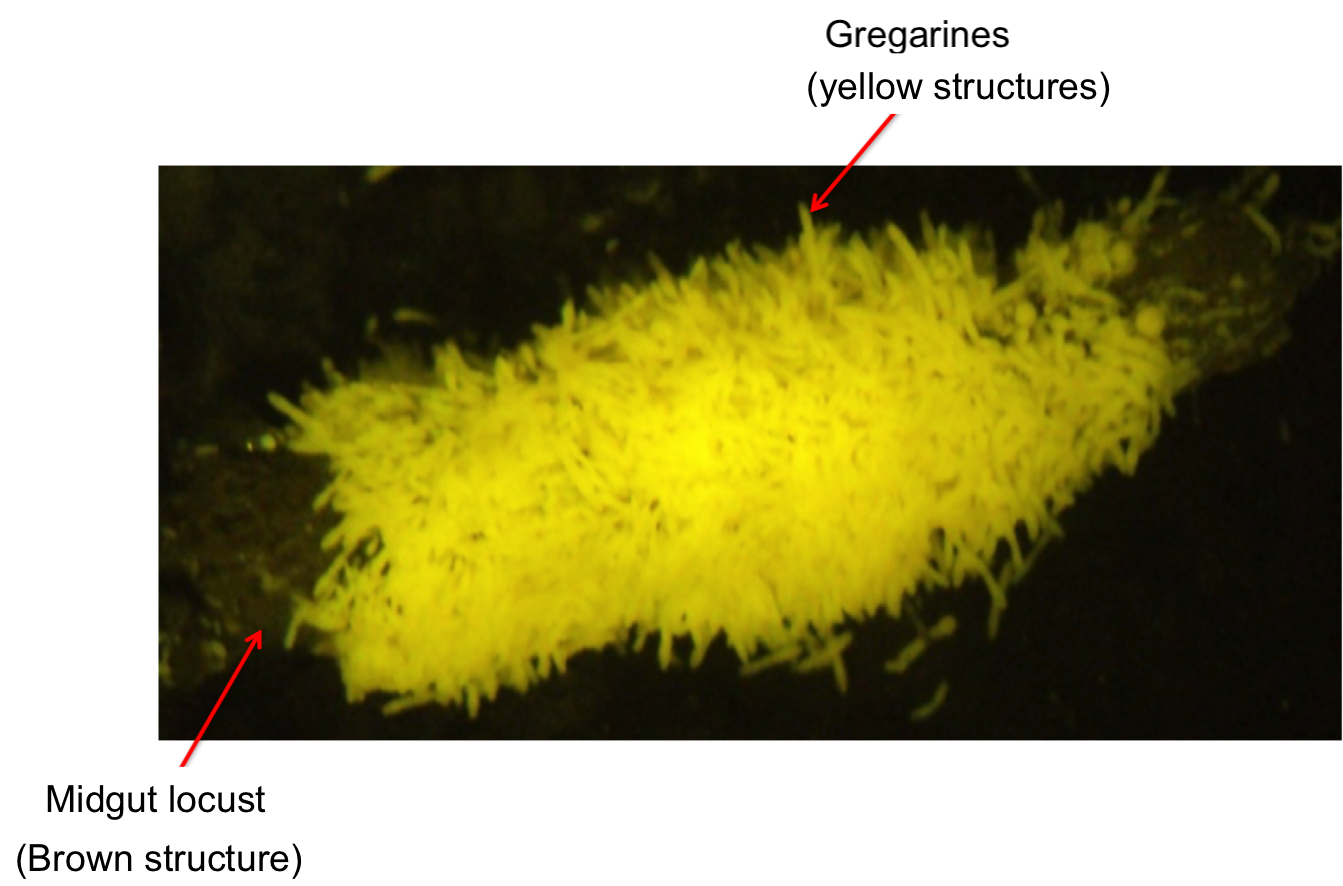
Gregarines visible in midgut of the desert locust

Gregarina garnhami is mainly found in the caeca and midgut of the desert locust where it attaches itself to the epithelial cells in order to feed. The uptake of food happens through the epimerite, attached to the host cell, after a while also the developed protomerite and deutomerite can take up nutrients. The uptake of nutrients happens through osmosis and pinocytosis (formation of a Cytostome). The nutrients are then stored as paraglycogen or fat. The hundreds of foldings of the cell surface give eugregarines a substantial enlargement of the cell-surface in order to take up more nutrients. More details need to be studied in regard of the nutrient uptake by gregarines, however, it is clear that they do not pierce the host cell to take up the cytoplasm. An apical complex is absent in the trophozoit stage in most eugregarines while it is this complex that is used by archigregarines for the uptake of nutrients by piercing the host cell. Gregarina garnhami stays present as a extracellular organism in the host, not penetrating the cell membrane of the host. The effect of G. garnhami on the host is not terribly severe but it is one of the few gregarines which are pathogenic. Harry 1970 found it to cause weight loss but not molting or feeding inhibition.

Gregarina garnhami could potentially be used for biocontrol of Schistocerca gregaria - adults and nymphs - and may be appropriate for deployment in Nepal.
