= Selenidioididae =

Scientific classification
- Domain: Eukaryota
- Clade: Sar
- Clade: Alveolata
- Phylum: Apicomplexa
- Class: Conoidasida
- Order: Archigregarinorida
- Family: Selenidioididae; Levine, 1971

Genera
- Filipodium; Merogregarina; Meroselenidium; Platyproteum; Selenidioides; Veloxidium

Family of single-celled organisms

The Selenidioididae are a family of parasitic alveolates in the phylum Apicomplexa. Species in this order infect marine invertebrates.

== Taxonomy ==
The order Archigregarinorida was redefined by Levine in 1971 and divided into two families: Exoschizonidae and Selenidioididae.

There are seven genera and 74 species recognised in this family.

== Description ==
Species in this family undergo asexual schizogony.

== Life cycle ==
The species in the family infect the gastrointestinal tract and are presumably transmitted by the orofaecal route but the details of this mechanism are presently unknown.
