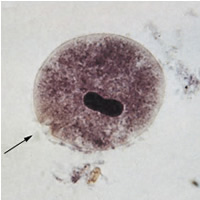
- Balantidium coli trophozoite

Scientific classification
- Domain: Eukaryota
- Clade: Sar
- Clade: Alveolata
- Phylum: Ciliophora
- Class: Litostomatea
- Order: Vestibuliferida
- Family: Balantidiidae
- Genus: Balantidium; Claparède & Lachmann, 1858

Type species
- Balantidium entozoon

Synonyms
- Balantidiopsis Bütschli, 1889; Balantioides Alexeieff, 1931; Bolantidium; Parabursaria Ghosh, 1921; Paranyctotherus Sandon, 1941

= Balantidium =

Genus of single-celled organisms

Balantidium is a genus of ciliates. It contains the parasitic species Balantidium coli, the only known cause of balantidiasis.

== History ==
The first-described species of Balantidium, B. entozoon, was described in 1838 by Ehrenberg as a member of the genus Bursaria. Balantidium coli observed in patients with dysentery was originally described as Paramecium coli by Malmstein in 1857. In 1858, Edouard Claparède and Johannes Lachmann created the genus Balantidium and reclassified B. entozoon as its type species. Stein in 1863, reclassified Paramecium coli into the genus Balantidium.

== Transcriptomics ==
Transcriptome data for Balantidium ctenopharyngodoni, from single-cell transcriptome sequencing, were published in 2017 and were the first omics data within the subclass Trichostomatia.

== Taxonomy ==
A separate genus – Neobalantidium – has been created for several of these species. Balantidium coli is one of the species that has been reclassified. It has also been proposed that it is a junior synonym of genus Balantioides–which has B. coli as the type species.

The closest known relative of this genus is Buxtonella sulcata, a parasite of cattle.

== Species ==
There are 72 species in the genus.

- Balantidium acanthuri
- Balantidium alpha
- Balantidium amblystomatis
- Balantidium amygdalli
- Balantidium aragaoi
- Balantidium bacteriophoros
- Balantidium beta
- Balantidium bicavata
- Balantidium blattarum
- Balantidium bovis
- Balantidium cameli
- Balantidium caprae
- Balantidium caviae
- Balantidium chagasi
- Balantidium coli
- Balantidium ctenopharyngodonis
- Balantidium cunhamunizi
- Balantidium cynocephale
- Balantidium dogieli
- Balantidium duodeni
- Balantidium elongatum
- Balantidium entozoon
- Balantidium falciformis
- Balantidium frugivori
- Balantidium galianoi
- Balantidium geigyi
- Balantidium geimani
- Balantidium giganteum
- Balantidium gracile
- Balantidium gracilis
- Balantidium granulosus
- Balantidium grimi
- Balantidium gyrans
- Balantidium gyranus
- Balantidium haughwouti
- Balantidium helenae
- Balantidium hydrae
- Balantidium indicum
- Balantidium kirbyi
- Balantidium major
- Balantidium marsupialis
- Balantidium medusarum
- Balantidium minor
- Balantidium minutum
- Balantidium nucleus
- Balantidium orchestium
- Balantidium osmaniae
- Balantidium ovatum
- Balantidium ovis
- Balantidium pellucidum
- Balantidium pheretima
- Balantidium philippiensis
- Balantidium piscicola
- Balantidium polyvacuolum
- Balantidium porcellae
- Balantidium prionurium
- Balantidium radiata
- Balantidium rhesum
- Balantidium rotundum
- Balantidium saigonensis
- Balantidium serpentina
- Balantidium simile
- Balantidium sinensis
- Balantidium spinibarbichthys
- Balantidium steinae
- Balantidium strelkovi
- Balantidium struthionis
- Balantidium suis
- Balantidium tapiri
- Balantidium testudinis
- Balantidium triangulatum
- Balantidium xenopi
- Balantidium zebrascopi
