= Protozoan infection =

Parasitic disease caused by a protozoan

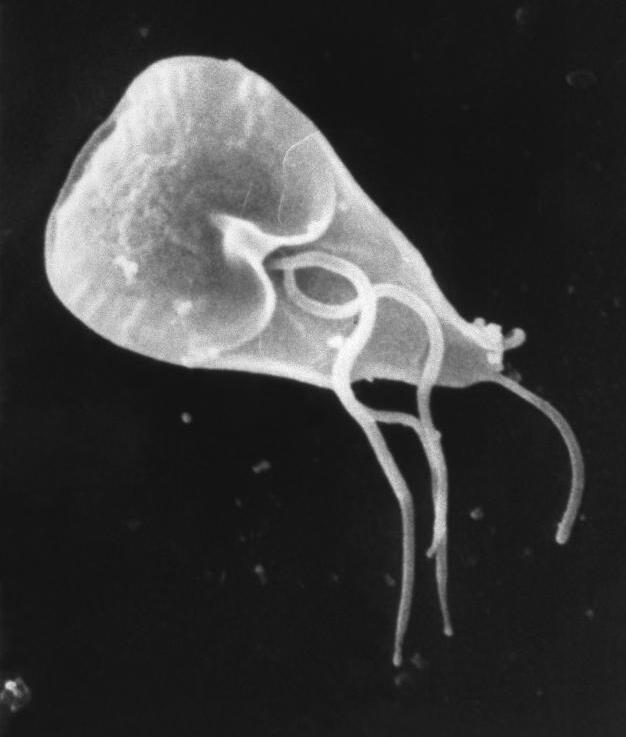
Giardia lamblia, an infectious protozoan

Protozoan infections are parasitic diseases caused by organisms formerly classified in the kingdom Protozoa. These organisms are now classified in the supergroups Excavata, Amoebozoa, Harosa (SAR supergroup), and Archaeplastida. Species classified as "protozoa" are eukaryotic organisms that are usually unicellular and motile, but they are not closely related to one another. While the terms protozoan and protist are usually discouraged in modern biosciences, this terminology is still encountered in medicine due to the conservative character of medical classification and the necessity of classifying organisms based on morphology.

Protozoan infections are usually transmitted either by an insect vector or by contact with an infected substance or surface. Protozoans are responsible for diseases affecting a wide range of organisms, including plants, animals, and some marine life. Many of the most prevalent and deadly human diseases are caused by a protozoan infection, including African sleeping sickness, amoebic dysentery, and malaria.

Protists are an artificial, polyphyletic grouping of over 64,000 different single-celled life forms, making them difficult to define due to their extreme uniqueness. This means that it is difficult to define protists due to their extreme differences and uniqueness. They grow in a wide variety of moist habitats and a majority of them are free-living organisms. In these moist environments, plankton and terrestrial forms can also be found. Protozoa are a subgroup of protists that obtain nutrients by breaking down organic compounds, either by decomposing dead organic matter, absorbing soluble products, or absorbing nutrients by phagocytosis.

Encystment occurs when a protist becomes a dormant cyst with a cell wall; during encystment, the cyst has decreased complexity and metabolic activity relative to the protist. Encystment protects the protist from environmental changes; the cyst can complete nuclear reorganization and cell division, and it can act as a host cell in order to transfer parasitic species. Excystment is when a return to favorable conditions may cause a cyst to return to its original state. In parasitic protists, excystment may occur when the cyst is ingested by a new host. Protists reproduce asexually or sexually. If the protists reproduce asexually, they do so through binary fission, multiple fission, budding, and fragmentation. If the protists reproduce sexually, they do so through a syngamy process where there is a fusion of the gametes. If this occurs in an individual it is recognized as autogamy. If this occurs between individuals, it is known as conjugation.

== Supergroup Excavata ==
Diagram of Plasmodium structure

Excavata are considered primitive eukaryotes. They are characterized by a feeding groove with a posteriorly located flagella, which allows them to create a current that captures small food particles. The cytostome is the specialized structure that allows the protists this function. This supergroup Excavata includes the subgroups Diplomonads (Fornicata), Parabasalids, and Euglenozoans.

=== Diplomonads ===
Diplomonads used to be defined as Fornicata, but their characteristics remain the same despite their renaming. They are microaerophilic protists. Diplomonads were previously defined by the lack of a mitochondrion, but recent studies have found that they have a nonfunctional, mitochondrial remnant organelle called a mitosome. Most are harmless except for Giardia, Hexamita salmonis, and Histomonas meleagridis. Giardia causes diarrhea, Hexamita salmonis is a fish parasite, and Histomonas meleagridis is a turkey pathogen.

Giardia intestinalis is a human pathogen, which is transmitted by cyst-contaminated water. It causes epidemic diarrhea from contaminated water. One can tell one may be infected by the observation of cysts or trophozoites in stools and ELISA (enzyme-linked immunosorbent assay) test. To prevent contamination, avoid any possibly contaminated water, and if contaminated water is the only thing available to drink, a slow sand filter should be used. A study found that the chlorination of water and nutritional intervention had no effect on childhood giardia infection. Only handwashing and hygienic sanitation interventions reduced infection rates in children.

Hexamita salmonis is a common flagellated fish pathogen. Infected fish are weak and emaciated, and typically swim on their sides.

Histomonas meleagridis is a common bird pathogen that causes histomoniasis. Signs of histomoniasis include reduced appetite, drooping wings, unkempt feathers, and yellow fecal droppings.

=== Parabasilia ===
Most Parabasalia are flagellated endosymbionts of animals. They lack a distinct cytostome, which means they must use phagocytosis to engulf food. There are two subgroups: Trichonympha and Trichomonadida. Trichonympha are obligate mutualists of wood-eating insects such as termites. They secrete cellulase, which is used for digesting wood. The next subgroup, Trichomonadida, does not require oxygen and possesses hydrogenosomes. They only reproduce through asexual reproduction and some strains are human pathogens. There are three types of pathogenic parabasalia: Trichomonas foetus, Dientamoeba fragilis, and Trichomonas vaginalis. Trichomonas foetus causes spontaneous abortion in cattle, Dientamoeba fragilis causes diarrhea in humans, and Trichomonas vaginalis is a sexually transmitted disease.

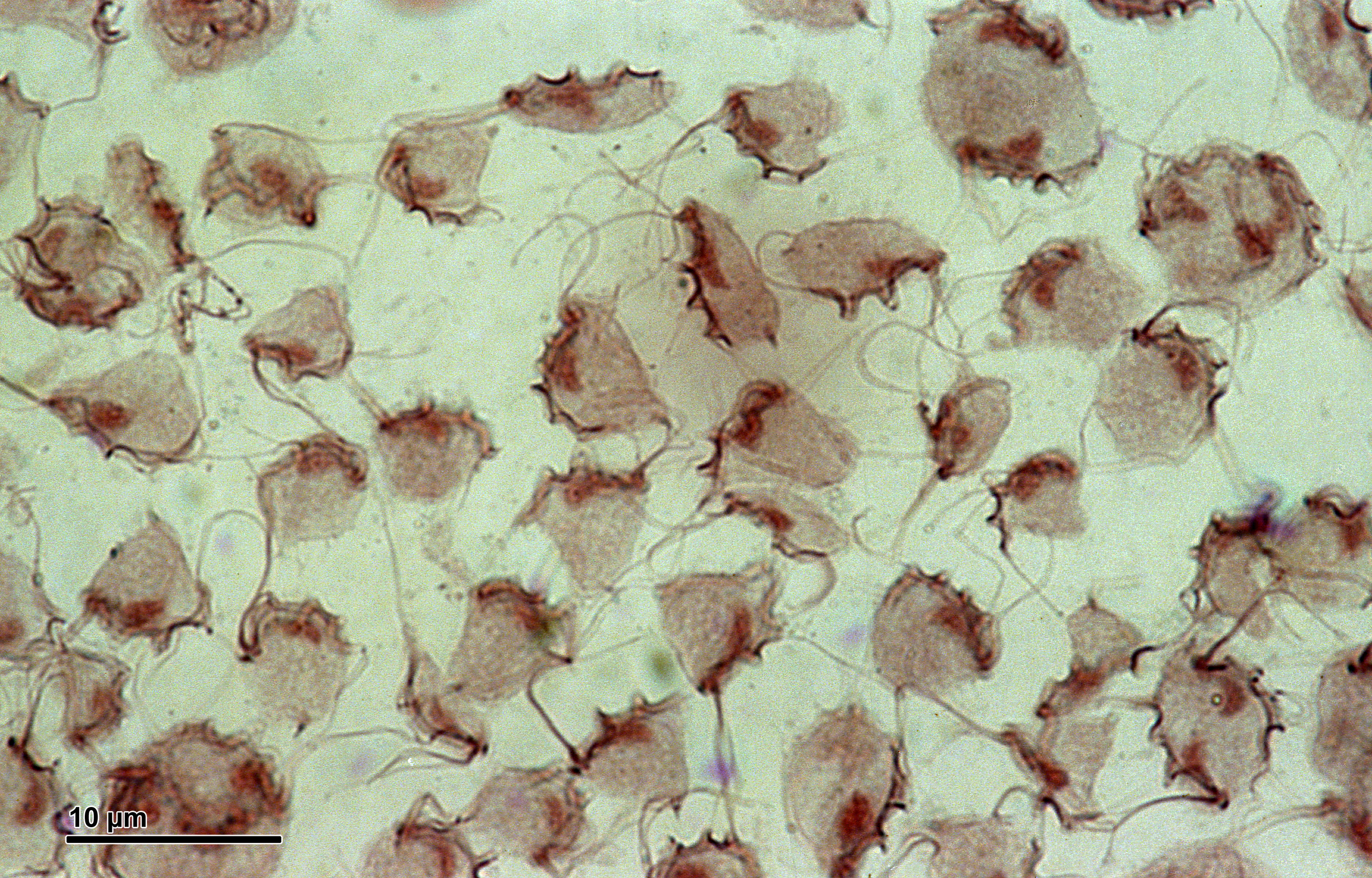
Image of a cultured Tritrichomonas foetus

Trichomonas foetus is a parasite that resides in the urogenital tract of cattle and causes bovine trichomoniasis. Trichomoniasis is a sexually transmitted disease that causes infertility in heifers. Most infertility is caused by sudden embryonic death. Various imidazoles have been used to treat infected bulls, but none are safe and effective. Ipronidazole is probably most effective but it frequently causes sterile abscesses at injection sites.

Dientamoeba fragilis is a parasite that lives in the large intestine of humans. No one knows how D. fragilis is spread; one possibility is from swallowing contaminated water or food. Many people who are infected with this parasite show no signs of being infected. Sometimes the infection can be observed; the most common symptoms include diarrhea, stomach pains, loss of appetite, nausea, and fatigue.

Trichomonas vaginalis is a sexually transmitted disease. Men who are infected rarely show any symptoms (asymptomatic). Women who are infected usually show signs of soreness, inflammation, and redness around the vagina and a possible change in vaginal discharge. Trichomonas vaginalis can be treated with a course of antibiotics.

=== Euglenozoa ===
Most Euglenozoa are photoautotrophic, but some are chemoorganotrophs (saprophytic). They are commonly found in freshwater. The members of the phylum Euglenozoa have a pellicle for support, a red eye spot called a stigma to orient the cell toward light, chlorophyll a and b to assist in the process of photosynthesis, contractile vacuoles, and flagella.

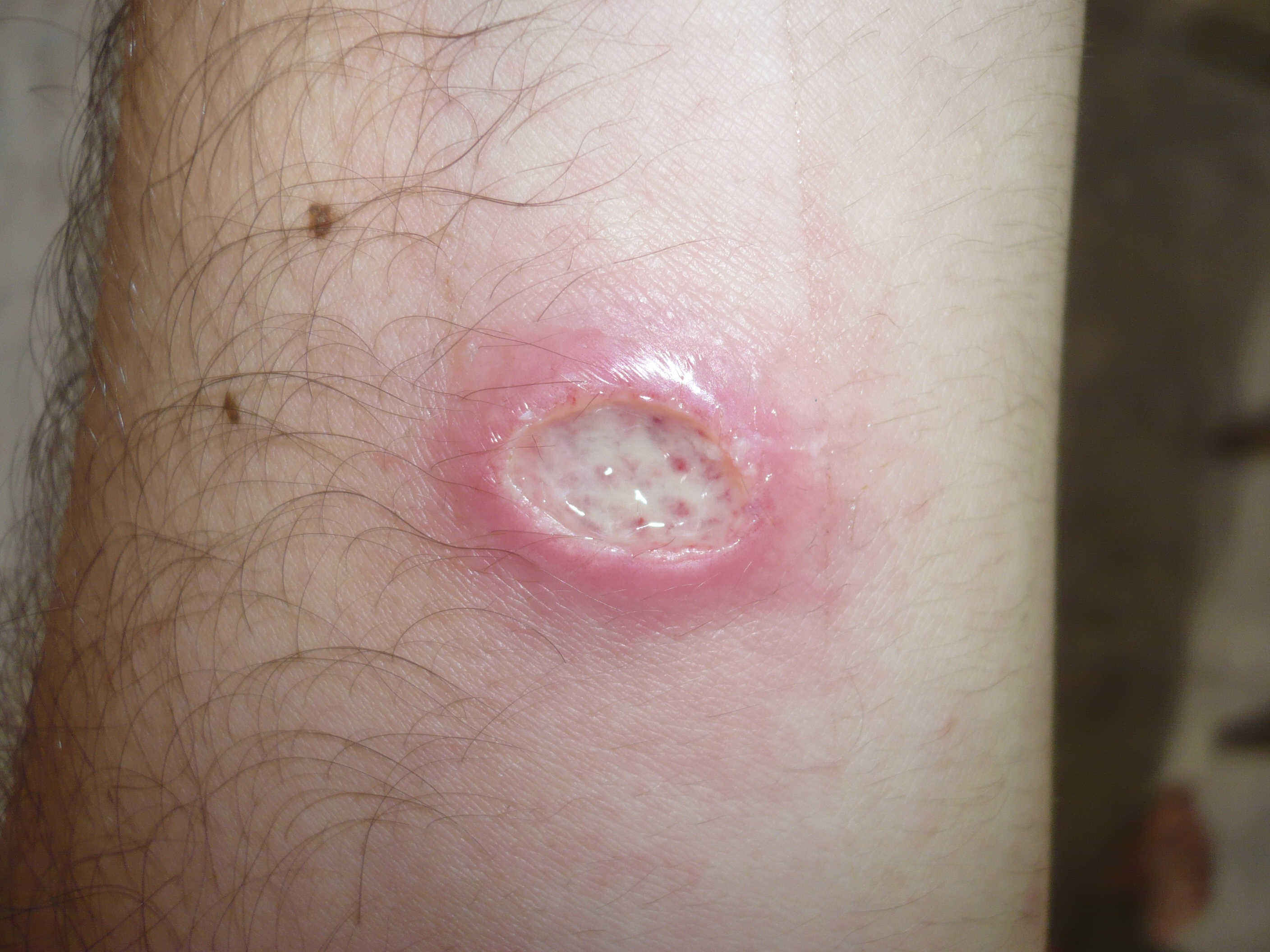
Leishmaniasis lesion on adult human forearm

One major pathogen from the phylum Euglenozoa is Leishmania. Leishmania causes leishmaniasis. The symptoms of leishmaniasis include systemic and skin/membrane damage. Leishmania parasites spread by phlebotomine sand flies in the tropics, subtropics, and southern Europe. They may manifest cutaneously (cutaneous leishmaniasis) as skin sores with a scab a few weeks after the bite or internally (visceral leishmaniasis), affecting the organs, which can be life-threatening. Cutaneous leishmaniasis can spread to the mucous membranes and cause mucosal leishmaniasis even years after the initial infection. Cutaneous leishmaniasis heals on its own and leaves bad scars. Only FDA approved for visceral leishmaniasis is amphotericin B and oral miltefosine for cutaneous and mucosal leishmaniasis diagnosis- tissue specimen, bone marrow, blood tests detect antibody to parasite for visceral leishmaniasis.

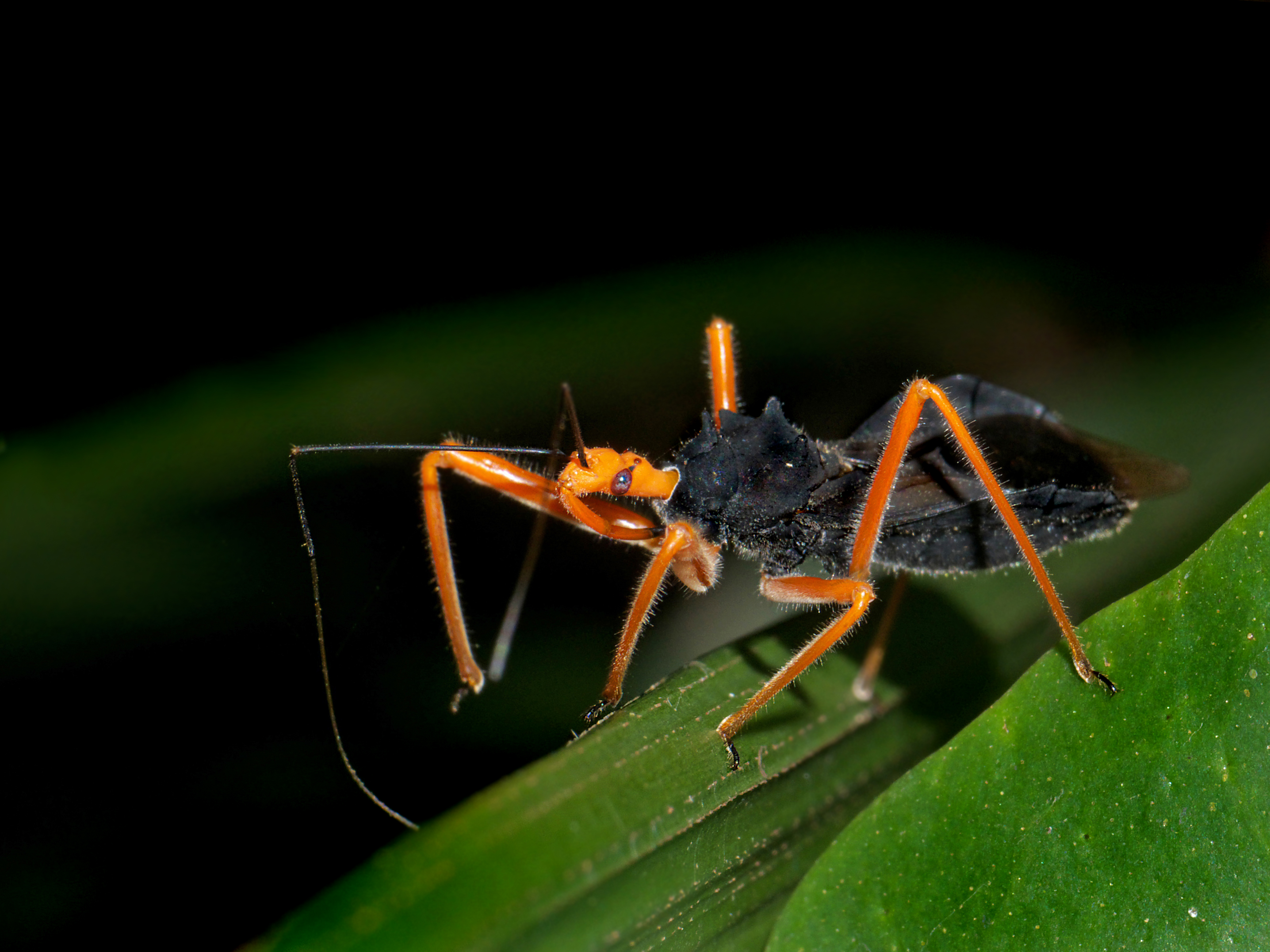
Reduviid Bug

The second pathogen from this phylum is Trypanosoma cruzi. Trypanosoma cruzi causes Chagas disease and is transmitted by the reduviid bug, also known as the "kissing bug." Chagas disease is diagnosed using a physical exam and blood test. The only treatment includes antiparasitics only from the CDC, which are not FDA approved. Acute Chagas disease has a quick onset, the trypanosomes enter the bloodstream, they become amastigotes, and replicate. Acute Chagas disease can be treated using benznidazole or nifurtimox. Chronic chagas disease is asymptomatic and causes heart and gastrointestinal cells to be affected. Currently, there are only investigational treatments for this disease. Unfortunately, vaccines are not effective with Chagas disease due to antigenic variation. This pathogen causes damage to the nervous system.

African Sleeping Sickness is caused by Trypanosoma brucei rhodensiense and Trypanosoma brucei gambiense, and is transmitted by the tsetse fly. It is diagnosed by a physical exam and blood test. African sleeping sickness causes interstitial inflammation, lethargy, brain swelling, and death within one to three years. Drug therapy, using Eflornithine and Melarsoprol Pentamidine for T. gambiense and Suramin (Antrypol) for either Trypanosoma brucei rhodensiense and Trypanosoma brucei gambiense, or combinations of these medications, can help treat this disease, but vaccines can not be used due to antigenic variation.

== Supergroup Amoebozoa ==
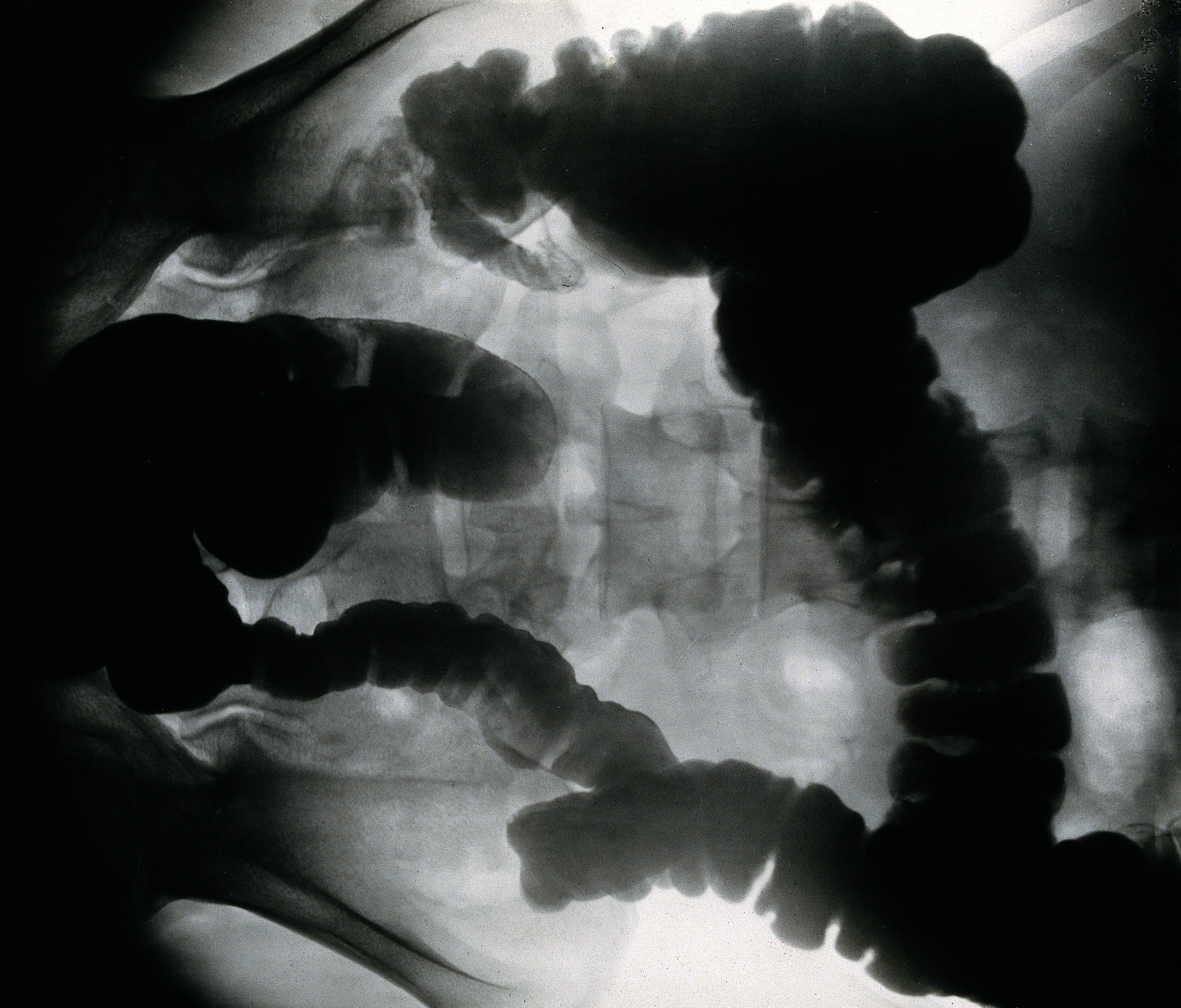
X-ray of colon infected with E. histolytica

Amoebozoa are characterized by the use of pseudopodia for movement and feeding. These protists reproduce by binary or multiple fission.

=== Entamoebida ===
Entamoebida lack mitochondria and possess mitosomes. Entamoeba histolytica is a pathogenic parasite known to cause amoebiasis, which is the third leading cause of parasitic deaths. It is diagnosed by the assessment of stool samples. Amoebiasis is caused by the ingestion of food or water contaminated with feces or other bodily wastes of an infected person, which contain cysts, the dormant form of the microbe. These cysts on reaching the terminal ileum region of the gastrointestinal tract give rise to a mass of proliferating cells, the trophozoite form of the parasite, by the process of excystation. Symptoms of this infection include diarrhea with blood and mucus, and can alternate between constipation and remission, abdominal pain, and fever. Symptoms can progress to ameboma, fulminant colitis, toxic megacolon, colonic ulcers, leading to perforation, and abscesses in vital organs like liver, lung, and brain. Amoebiasis can be treated with the administration of anti-amoebic compounds, this often includes the use of Metronidazole, Ornidazole, Chloroquine, Secnidazole, Nitazoxanide and Tinidazole. Tinidazole may be effective in curing children. The usage of conventional therapeutics to treat amoebiasis if often linked with substantial side effects, a threat to the efficacy of these therapeutics, further worsened by the development of drug resistance in the parasite. Amoebic meningoencephalitis and keratitis is a brain-eating amoeba caused by free-living Naeglaria and Acanthomoeba. One way this pathogen can be acquired is by soaking contact lenses in water instead of contact solution. This will result in progressive ulceration of the cornea. This pathogen can be diagnosed by demonstration of amoebae in clinical specimens. There is currently no drug therapy available for amoebic meningoencephalitis and keratitis.

== Supergroup SAR ==
The supergroup SAR includes Stramenopiles, Alveolata and Rhizaria, and is distinguished by fine pseudopodia which can be branched, simple, or connected.

=== Stramenopila ===
Some members of Stramenopila are brown algae, diatoms, and water molds. An example of Stramenopila are Peronosporomycetes. The most well-known example of Peronosporomycetes is Phytophthora infestans. This organism caused the Great Famine of Ireland in the 1850s.

=== Alveolata ===
Alveolata is a large group, which includes Dinoflagellata, Ciliates (Ciliophora, and Apicomplexa.

Toxoplasmosis life cycle between humans and animals

Balantidium coli (Balantidiasis) is an example of a member of the phylum Ciliophora. Balantidiasis is the only ciliate known to be capable of infecting humans, and swine are the primary reservoir host. Balantidiasis is opportunistic and rare in Western countries. Apicomplexans are parasites of animals and contain an arrangement of organelles called the apical complex. One example of an apicomplexan is Malaria. Five species of plasmodium cause malaria in animals. Malaria is transmitted by the bite of an infected female mosquito. Symptoms of malaria include: periodic chills and fever, anemia, and hypertrophy of the liver and spleen. Cerebral malaria can occur in children. In order to diagnose Malaria, doctors will look for parasites in Wright-or-Giemsa-stained red blood cells and serological tests. Treatment includes antimalarial drugs, however, resistance has been observed. New vaccines are being discovered to this day. Preventative measures that can be taken include sleeping with netting and using insecticide to prevent mosquitoes. Eimeria is another example of an apicomplexan pathogen. This pathogen causes cecal coccidiosis in chickens. Coccidiosis is a parasitic disease of the intestinal tract. This disease is treated by placing anticoccidials in the chickens' feed. It also causes malabsorption, diarrhea, and sometimes bloody diarrhea in animals. Theileria parva & T. annulata are tick-borne parasites which cause fatal East Coast fever in cattle. East Coast fever is transmitted by the bite of the three-host tick Phipicephalus appendiculatus and results in respiratory failure and death in African cattle. Most hosts of P. appendiculatus succumb to pulmonary edema and die within three weeks of infection. The severity of the infection can be lessened by treatment with antiprotozoal drugs like buparvaquone. Toxoplasma causes toxoplasmosis and can be acquired from undercooked meat or cat feces containing Toxoplasma gondii. The majority of the 60 million Americans infected with T. gondii are asymptomatic. The group most vulnerable to this pathogen are the fetuses of mothers who have been infected with the parasite for the first time during pregnancy. This can result in damage to the fetus's brain, eyes, and other organs. Treatment is available for pregnant women and the immunosuppressed. Cryptosporidiosis can be contracted through contact with water, food, soil, or surfaces contaminated with feces containing the Cryptosporidium. Immunocompromised people are the most susceptible. Cryptosporidiosis causes watery diarrhea and can resolve itself without medical intervention. It is diagnosed by examining stool samples, and diarrhea can be treated using Nitazoxanide.

=== Rhizaria ===
Plasmodiophorids and Halosporidians are two examples of parasitic Rhizaria. Plasmodiophorids cause infections in crops such as Spongospora subterranea. They cause powdery scabs and galls and disrupt growth. Halosporidians cause infections in marine invertebrates such as Mikrocytos mackini in Pacific oysters. Mikrocytos mackini are abscesses or green pustules on palps and mantles of certain molluscs.

== Archaeplastida ==
The supergroup Archaeplastida includes red algae, green algae and land plants. Each of these three groups have multicellular species and the green and red algae have many single-celled species. The land plants are not considered protists.

Red algae are primarily multicellular, lack flagella, and range in size from microscopic, unicellular to large, multicellular forms. Some species of red algae contain phycoerythrins, photosynthetic accessory pigments that are red in color and outcompete the green tint of chlorophyll, making these species appear as varying shades of red. This group doesn't include many pathogens.

Green algae exhibit similar features to the land plants, particularly in terms of chloroplast structure. The green algae are subdivided into the chlorophytes and charophytes. It is very rare for green algae to become parasitic.

Prototheca moriformis belongs to the subdivision Chloroplastida. P. moriformis is a green algae that lacks chlorophyll and has turned to parasitism. It is found in sewage and the soil. P. moriformis causes a disease called protothecosis. This disease mainly infects cattle and dogs. Cattle can be affected by prototheca enteritis and mastitis. Protothecosis is commonly seen in dogs; it enters the body through the mouth or nose and causes infection in the intestines. Treatment with amphotericin B has been reported.

== Future Treatment ==
Scientists have been researching new ways to fight protozoan infections, including targeting channels and transporters involved in the diseases and finding the link between a person's microbiome and their ability to resist a protozoan infection

== See also ==
- Parasitic infection
- Babesiosis
- Giardiasis
- Cyclosporiasis
