= Blastogregarinorina =

Scientific classification
- Domain: Eukaryota
- Clade: Sar
- Superphylum: Alveolata
- Phylum: Apicomplexa
- Class: Conoidasida
- Order: Eugregarinorida
- Suborder: Blastogregarinorina; Chatton & Villeneuve 1936

Families and genera
- Siedleckiidae; Siedleckia

Suborder of single-celled parasites

Blastogregarinorina is a suborder of parasitic alveolates of the phylum Apicomplexa.

== Taxonomy ==
This suborder currently has one family with one genus which contains one species Siedleckia caulleryi. This species is found in marine polychaetes.

== History ==
This suborder was described by Chatton and Villeneuve in 1936

== Description ==
A mucron is present.

Syzygy does not occur.

The gamonts are composed of a single structure without septa: they lack both protomerites and deutomerites.

Anisogamy — unequal sized gamonts — is present. Gamogony occurs with gamonts still attached to intestinal wall. The gametes bud off gamonts. Gametocysts are absent.

There is no sporocyst.

The zygote gives rise to 10–16 oocysts.
