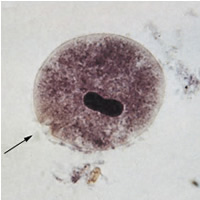
- Balantidium coli trophozoite

Scientific classification
- Domain: Eukaryota
- Clade: Sar
- Clade: Alveolata
- Phylum: Ciliophora
- Class: Litostomatea
- Order: Vestibuliferida
- Family: Balantidiidae; Reichenow in Doflein & Reichenow, 1929

Type genus
- Balantidium

= Balantidiidae =

Genus of single-celled organisms

Balantidiidae is a biological family of chromists in the phylum Ciliophora. The family name comes from the type genus Balantidium.

== Distribution ==
The Balantidium coli species has a worldwide distribution, but is more frequent in subtropical and temperate climates. The medical condition balantidiasis is particularly prevalent where poor hygiene and undernourishment weaken a population coincide with living in close contact with pigs, the main reservoir for the species.
