= Schizocystidae =

Scientific classification
- Domain: Eukaryota
- Clade: Sar
- Superphylum: Alveolata
- Phylum: Apicomplexa
- Class: Conoidasida
- Order: Neogregarinorida
- Suborder: Schizogregarinina
- Family: Schizocystidae; Léger and Duboscq, 1908

Genera
- Lymphotropha; Machadoella; Schizocystis

Family of single-celled organisms

The Schizocystidae are a family of parasitic alveolates in the phylum Apicomplexa. Species in this family infect insects (Diptera, Coleoptera and Hemiptera).

== History ==
This family was described by Léger and Duboscq in 1908.

== Taxonomy ==
Three genera are currently recognised in this family. The type genus is Schizocystis.

== Lifecycle ==
The parasites develop in extracellular locations. The trophozoites are large, band like and wide. They have longitudinal striae and are aseptate. A mucron of small pseudopods or sucker is present. The nuclei are large.

Merogony occurs once in the lifecycle. Nuclear division proceeds with binary fission during growth. Cytokinesis occurs to form uninucleate merozoites arranged in clusters in the shape of the trophozoite. The merozoites become free by dropping off the parent trophozoite.

Gamonts, gametocysts and oocysts are of the actinocephalid type with syzygy occurring just before gametocyst formation.

The young gamonts are vermiform (wormlike). The gametocysts are mostly spherical. The oocysts are spindle-shaped with eight sporozoites.
