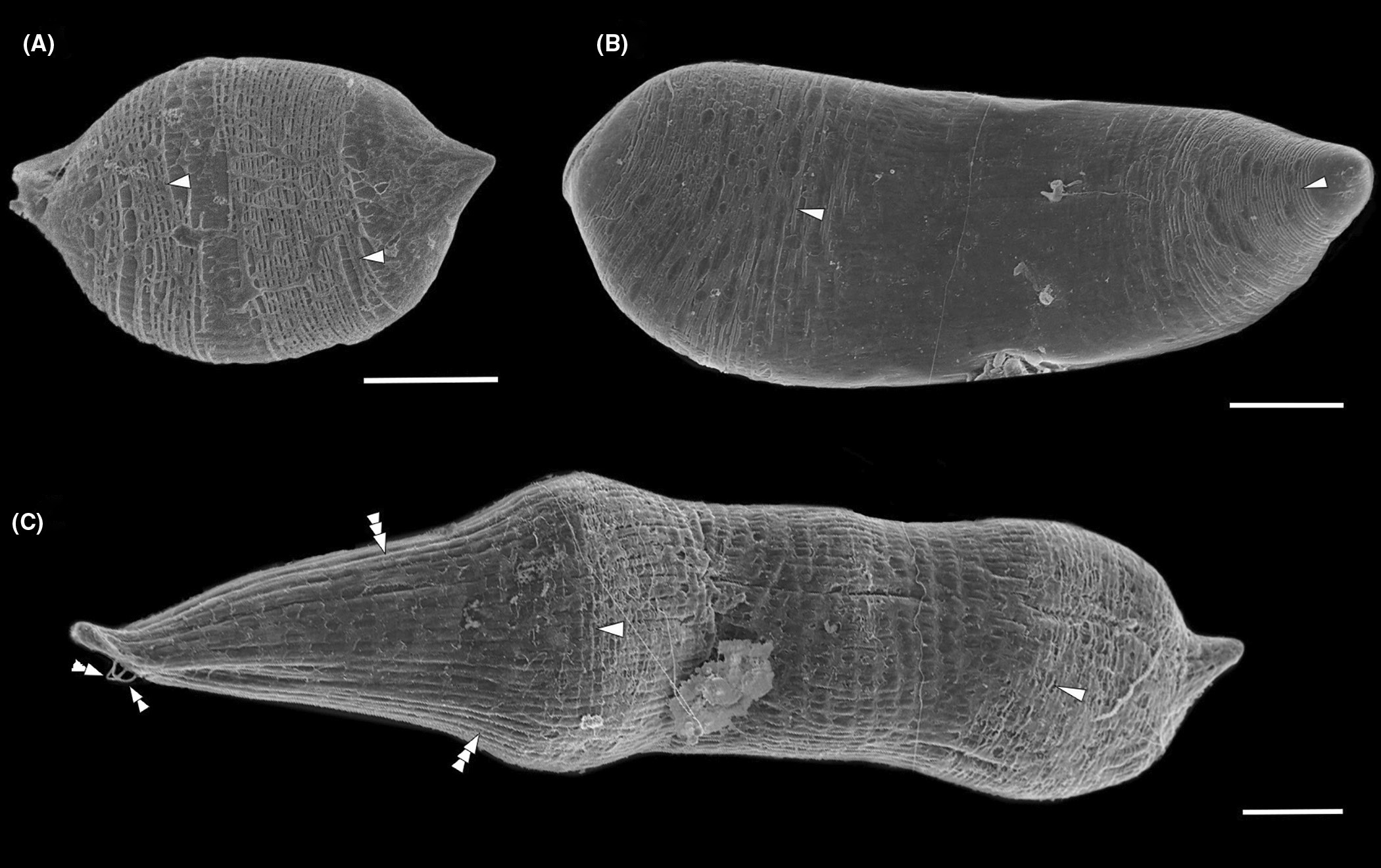
- Scanning electron micrographs of Platyproteum vivax

Scientific classification
- Domain: Eukaryota
- Supergroup: Alveolata
- Clade: ACS
- Class: Squirmidea; Cavalier-Smith 2014
- Order: Squirmida; Cavalier-Smith 2014

Genera
- Filipodium; Platyproteum; Digyalum

= Squirmid =

Class of parasitic alveolates

Squirmids are a class and order of parasitic alveolates.

== Characteristics ==
Squirmids are lumenal parasites that infest the intestines of sipunculids. Some have an intracellular stage, which consists of flattened trophonts (Platyproteum) or trophonts located only at the apical end (Filipodium). Their trophonts contain an asymmetrical rostrum that can extend. As is typical of most gregarines, they lack a symmetrical apical mucron. If epicytic folds are present, they are shallower than those of gregarinomorphs and are underlain by longitudinal microtubules. Their fibrillar skeleton is not complex; they differ from orthogregarines and urosporoids in that they lack gliding motility. It is unknown whether they reproduce sexually, whether they possess an apical complex, or whether they exhibit merogony, cilia, or rhoptries. The name of the class, Squirmidea, derives from the word "squirm," referring to these alveolates' squirming motility. It contains the single order Squirmida.

=== Filipodium ===
The trophonts of the genus Filipodium are covered with hair-like projections called cytopili and possess a high capacity for contraction, such as bending and twisting. These trophonts are supported by tubular extensions of the cortical alveoli but lack a microtubular or fibrillar axoneme. In some species, at least the cytopili are arranged longitudinally in every third or fifth longitudinal groove; the cell tip is flattened, can often expand laterally, and is triangular in shape with rounded corners, being wider than the body.

=== Platyproteum ===
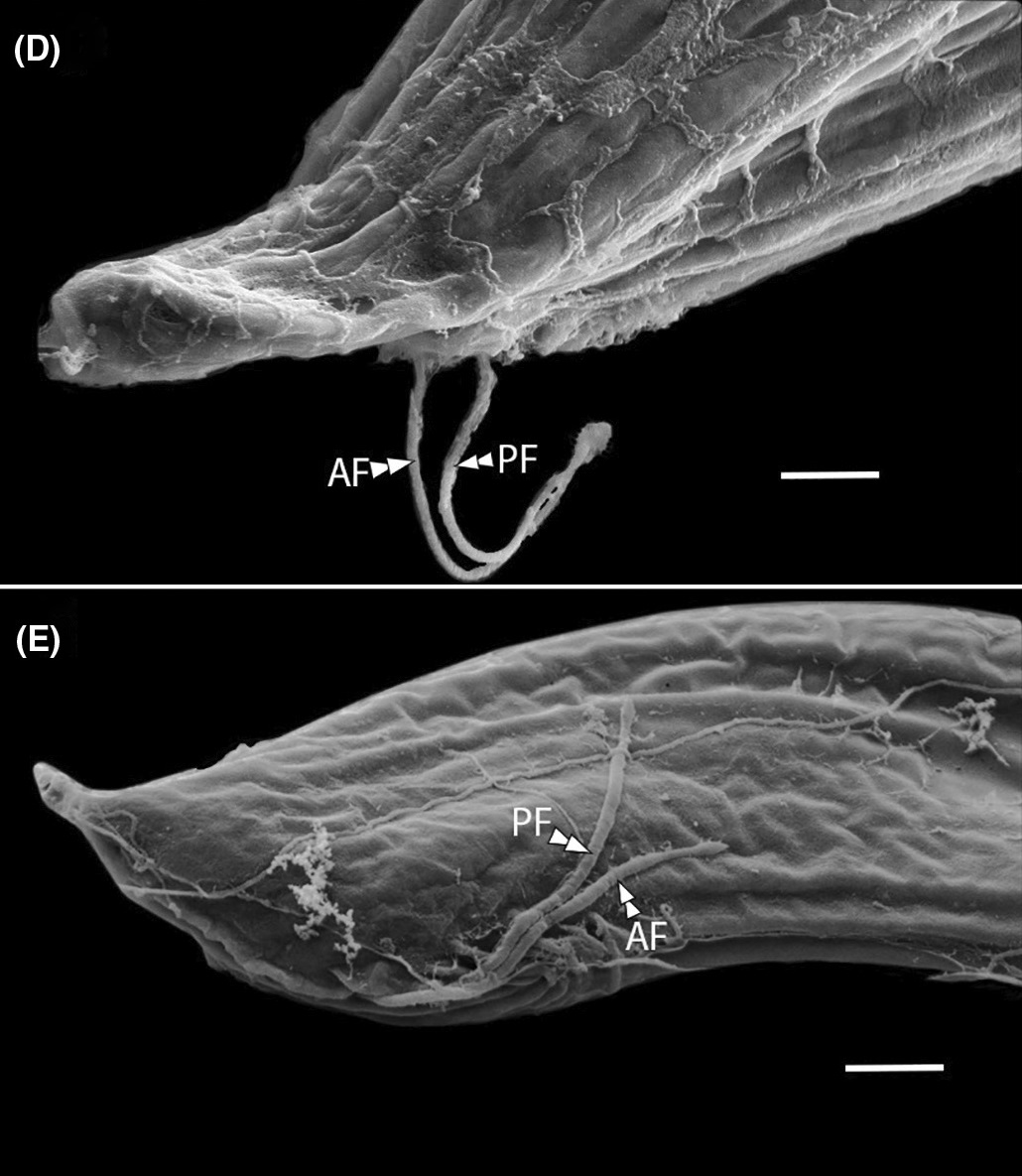
Scanning electron micrographs of the trophozoites in Platyproteum vivax.

The trophozoite of Platyproteum temporarily exhibits fine transverse striations; it is associated with peristaltic motility but lacks hair-like projections and longitudinal folds. It exhibits bending and peristaltic shape changes. Its asymmetrical and flattened rostrum can elongate. It has both lumenal and intracellular stages. No evidence has been found to suggest that it undergoes merogony.

== Taxonomy ==
Cavalier-Smith proposed the class Squirmidea and order Squirmida and families Filipodiidae and Platyproteidae in 2014, each containing one genus; the former Filipodium and the latter Platyproteum. He assigned them to Perkinsozoa. Later, the genus Digyalum was also added to this group, and it was discovered that Squirmida belongs to a clade named ACS that also contains apicomplexans and chrompodellids.

== Phylogeny ==
- ACS
  - - Apicomplexans
    - Chrompodellids
  - Squirmids
    - - Platyproteidae
        Platyproteum
      - Filipodiidae
        Filipodium
    - Digyalum
