= Ophryocystis elektroscirrha =

Scientific classification
- Domain: Eukaryota
- Clade: Sar
- Clade: Alveolata
- Phylum: Apicomplexa
- Class: Conoidasida
- Order: Neogregarinorida
- Family: Ophryocystidae
- Genus: Ophryocystis
- Species: O. elektroscirrha

Binomial name
- Ophryocystis elektroscirrha McLaughlin & Myers, 1970

Species of single-celled organism

Ophryocystis elektroscirrha (sometimes abbreviated OE or O.e.) is an obligate, neogregarine protozoan parasite that infects Danaus (tiger) butterflies. The species was first discovered in Florida, around the late 1960s. Since then, it has been found in every monarch population examined to date, including monarchs sampled in North America, Hawaii, Australia, Cuba, and Central and South America.

Dormant spores occur on the cuticles of butterflies, in between the butterfly's scales. They are small, brown or black objects about 1/100 the width of a butterfly scale.

Ophryocystis elektroscirrha was long thought to exclusively parasitize monarch (Danaus plexippus) and queen (Danaus gilippus) butterflies, however a study by Gao et al. (2020) discovered OE or an OE-like parasite on three noctuid moth species, and Parthenos sylvia, another butterfly in the monarch family.

== Life cycle ==
Ophryocystis elektroscirrha is most often transmitted from females to their offspring, when spores stick to the female's body and get scattered on her eggs and the surface of milkweed leaves, the host plants of monarch and queen caterpillars. Male butterflies can also have O. elektroscirrha, and scatter the dormant spores onto milkweed leaves as they fly around, or pass them onto females during mating.

Spores of O. elektroscirrha are ingested by the caterpillars when they eat their egg chorion (shell) after they hatch, and when they feed from infected milkweed. Once the parasite has entered the host's gut, the spores open and emerging sporozoites penetrate the gut wall and migrate to the hypoderm (the layer of cells that secrete the larva's cuticle), where they undergo two phases of vegetative reproduction. After the caterpillar pupates, O. elektroscirrha starts reproducing sexually. Three days before the adults emerge, developing parasite spores can be seen through their pupal integuments. The adult butterflies emerge covered with spores, mostly on their abdomens. Parasites do not continue to replicate on adult butterflies, and spores must be eaten by larvae before they can cause new infections.

== Effects on monarchs ==
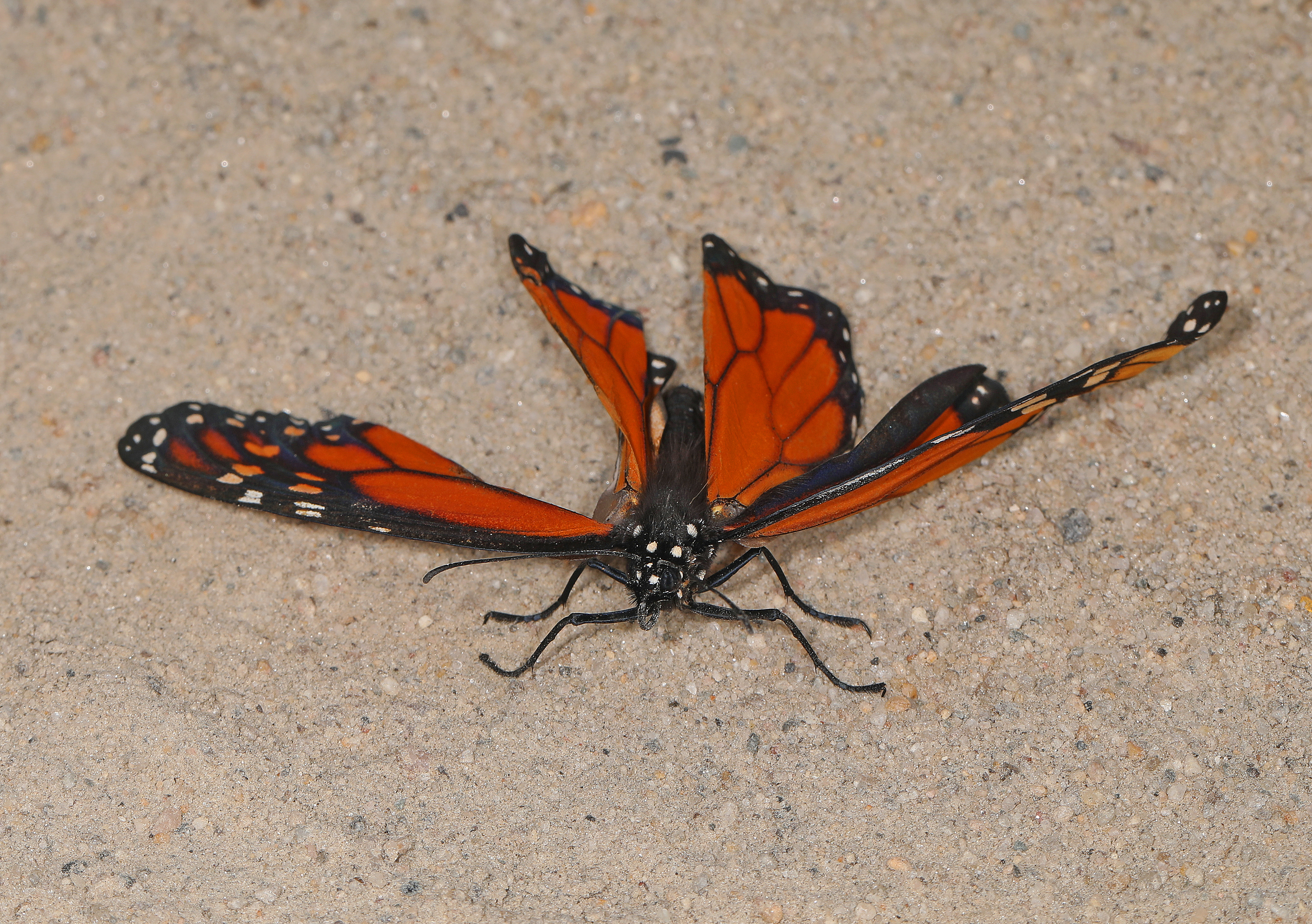
Adult monarch with Ophryocystis elektroscirrha.

O. elektroscirrha is geographically widespread and may have a long history of occurrence with monarch butterflies. Infection by O. elektroscirrha causes monarchs to have lower survival rates. O. elektroscirrha has negative effects on survival and fitness. This is more severe when larvae ingest a larger number of spores, and are infected at earlier instars. Statistically significant infection rates result in abnormal adult eclosion. High infection can result in smaller wingspans and lower weights. Mating success decreases with higher parasite loads and, though females that mate and lay eggs have a shorter lifespan, they have no decrease in egg-laying. Spores are passed from female to caterpillar. Parasite levels vary between geographical populations ranging from 70% to 3%. This is not the case in laboratory rearing, where after a few generations, all individuals can be infected.

Infection with this parasite results in culling. Migrating monarchs that are infected are less likely to complete the migration. Populations which migrate have lower parasite loads than those which are non-migratory.

== Infection rates ==
The prevalence (proportion of butterflies infected) with O. elektroscirrha is highly variable and it varies inversely with host migration distances. Non-migratory populations can have an infection rate of up to 70%. Thirty percent of the western migratory population are also infected. Less than 8% of monarchs from the eastern migratory population are heavily infected.

O. elektroscirrha parasites are viable for two weeks across a range of temperatures (3–32 °C), but prolonged high heat causes a decrease in spore viability.

The only currently known way of treating the Ophryocystis parasite is by soaking the butterfly's eggs in a light bleach solution, which kills the spores that are present on the eggs' surface.

== Anti-parasitic properties of milkweed ==
Adult female monarchs who are infected with O. elektroscirrha have been found to preferentially lay their eggs on varieties of milkweed that have higher levels of cardenolides, compounds which are toxic to the parasite and help to reduce spore loads and lower its virulence.

Tropical milkweed, Asclepias curassavica, has higher anti-parasite properties than swamp milkweed, A. incarnata.
