= Ophryocystis =

- SEM image showing an Ophryocystis elektroscirrha spore on a monarch butterfly scale

Scientific classification
- Domain: Eukaryota
- Clade: Sar
- Clade: Alveolata
- Phylum: Apicomplexa
- Class: Conoidasida
- Order: Neogregarinorida
- Family: Ophryocystidae
- Genus: Ophryocystis; Schneider, 1883

Genus of protozoan parasites

Ophryocystis is a genus of neogregarine protozoan parasites that infect insects in the orders Coleoptera and Lepidoptera. Ophryocystis species with beetle hosts replicate in the Malpighian tubules, while those infecting butterflies do so in the hypodermis.

== Species in this group ==
There are currently 16 described Ophryocystis species. The most well known and extensively studied is Ophryocystis elektroscirrha, which infects Danaus (monarch and queen) butterflies.
