= Schizogregarinina =

Scientific classification
- Domain: Eukaryota
- Clade: Sar
- Superphylum: Alveolata
- Phylum: Apicomplexa
- Class: Conoidasida
- Order: Neogregarinorida
- Suborder: Schizogregarinina; Léger, 1907

Families
- Ophryocystidae; Schizocystidae

Suborder of single-celled organisms

Schizogregarinina is a suborder in the phylum Apicomplexa.

== History ==
This suborder was described by Léger in 1907.

== Taxonomy ==
There are two families (Ophryocystidae and Schizocystidae) in this suborder.

== General characteristics ==
Species in this suborder infect the intestines of arthropods, annelids and tunicates.

The trophozoites may develop intracellularly or extracellularly. In species where the trophozoites develop extracellularly, they are attached by an epimerite. When the schizonts develop they appear like a bunch of grapes attached to the cell.
