= Tipulocystis =

Scientific classification
- Domain: Eukaryota
- Clade: Sar
- Clade: Alveolata
- Phylum: Apicomplexa
- Class: Conoidasida
- Order: Neogregarinorida
- Family: Caulleryellidae
- Genus: Tipulocystis; Kramár, 1950

Species
- Tipulocystis maxima

Genus of flies

Tipulocystis is a genus of parasitic alveolates of the phylum Apicomplexa. Species in this genus infect insects (Diptera).

== Taxonomy ==
This genus was described by Kramár in 1950.

There is one species currently recognised in this genus.

The type species is Tipulocystis maximae.

== Description ==
The species in this genus are spread by the orofaecal route. They infect the epithelium of the gut.

After ingestion the sporozoites attach to the intestinal epithelial cells by a pseudomerite and become multinucleate, irregularly shaped plasmodia

They then divide internally becoming mycetoid meronts which release merozoites.

The merozoites become mononucleate gregarinoid meronts which also attach to the intestinal epithelium by a pseudomerite.

They subsequently differentiate into meronts which are then released.

The meronts which are released serve as gamonts that fuse in pairs forming a gametocyst.

The gametocyst then transforms into a single oocyst which contains 8 sporozoites.

== Host records ==
- Cranefly (Tipula maxima)
