= Merogregarina =

Scientific classification
- Domain: Eukaryota
- Clade: Sar
- Superphylum: Alveolata
- Phylum: Apicomplexa
- Class: Conoidasida
- Order: Archigregarinorida
- Family: Selenidioididae
- Genus: Merogregarina; Porter, 1908
- Species: M. amaroucii

Binomial name
- Merogregarina amaroucii Porter, 1908

Genus of single-celled organisms

Merogregarina is a genus of parasitic alveolates in the phylum Apicomplexa. Species in this genus infect marine invertebrates.

== Taxonomy ==
This species was described in 1908 by Porter.

There is one species in this genus – Merogregarina amaroucii.

== Description ==
The trophozoites are found in the intestinal lumen. They measure 23–31 microns x 11–15 microns. They are initially ovoid and become vermiform as they mature. The single nucleus lies at the anterior end and has one nucleolus.

The trophozoites develop in multinucleated schizonts which give rise to 8–20 merozoites. The merozoites are 5–6 microns x 1 micron.

The sporocysts give rise to eight sporozoites.

== Life cycle ==
This species is found in species of the ascidian genus Amaroucium.

The parasite infects the gastrointestinal tract and is presumably transmitted by the orofaecal route but the details of this mechanism are presently unknown.

Schizogony is intracellular.
