= Selenidioides =

Scientific classification
- Domain: Eukaryota
- Clade: Sar
- Superphylum: Alveolata
- Phylum: Apicomplexa
- Class: Conoidasida
- Order: Archigregarinorida
- Family: Selenidioididae
- Genus: Selenidioides; Levine, 1971

Species
- Selenidioides axiferens Selenidioides caulleryi Selenidioides fanthami Selenidioides giganteum Selenidioides grassei Selenidioides hawesi Selenidioides hollandei Selenidioides intraepitheliale Selenidioides mesnili Selenidioides metchnikovi Selenidioides potamillae Selenidioides sipunculi

Genus of single-celled organisms

Selenidioides is a genus of parasitic alveolates in the phylum Apicomplexa. Species in this genus infect marine invertebrates.

== Taxonomy ==
The order Archigregarinorida was redefined by Levine in 1971. This reorganisation lead to the creation of two new families (Exoschizonidae and Selenidioididae) and several genera including Selenidioides.

There are 11 species in this genus.

== Life cycle ==
The parasites in the genus infect the gastrointestinal tract and are presumably transmitted by the orofaecal route but the details of this mechanism are presently unknown.
