= Lymphotropha =

Scientific classification
- Domain: Eukaryota
- Clade: Sar
- Superphylum: Alveolata
- Phylum: Apicomplexa
- Class: Conoidasida
- Order: Neogregarinorida
- Family: Schizocystidae
- Genus: Lymphotropha; Ashford, 1965
- Species: L. tribolii

Binomial name
- Lymphotropha tribolii Ashford, 1965

Genus of single-celled organisms

Lymphotropha is a genus of parasitic alveolates in the phylum Apicomplexa.

== History ==
This genus was described by Ashford in 1965.

== Taxonomy ==
There is one species in this genus, Lymphotropha tribolii.

== Life cycle ==
This genus infects the flour beetle Tribolium castaneum.

The sporozoites enter the host by the oral route, usually by ingestion of contaminated food but also by cannibalism of an infected host.

Infection with this genus increases larval mortality and interferes with normal development.
