= Gigaductidae =

Scientific classification
- Domain: Eukaryota
- Clade: Sar
- Superphylum: Alveolata
- Phylum: Apicomplexa
- Class: Conoidasida
- Order: Neogregarinorida
- Family: Gigaductidae; Filipponi 1948

Genera
- Gigaductus

Family of single-celled organisms

The Gigaductidae are a family of parasites in the phylum Apicomplexa. Species in this family infect Coleoptera (beetles) and Orthoptera (grasshoppers).

== History ==
This family was created in 1948 by Filipponi.

== Taxonomy ==
There is one genus in this family - Gigaductus. The type species in this family (and genus) is Gigaductus anchi.

Several other species in this family have described and these include Gigaductus aficanus, Gigaductus agoni, Gigaductus americanus and Gigaductus anchi.

== Lifecycle ==
The species in this family are spread by the oral-faecal route.

Development occurs in the epithelial cells of the gut or rarely in the Malpighian tubules.

The gamontocysts are enclosed in a thick gelatinous capsule.

Syzygy and encystment occur in the lumen of the gut (or tubule).

About 25-30 spores are generated from each gametocyst.
