= Siedleckia =

Scientific classification
- Domain: Eukaryota
- Clade: Sar
- Superphylum: Alveolata
- Phylum: Apicomplexa
- Class: Conoidasida
- Order: Eugregarinorida
- Family: Siedleckiidae
- Genus: Siedleckia

Species
- Siedleckia caulleryi Siedleckia dogieli Siedleckia mesnili Siedleckia nematoides

Genus of single-celled organisms

Siedleckia are a genus of parasitic alveolates in the phylum Apicomplexa. Species in this genus infect marine invertebrates.

== Taxonomy ==
This genus was described by Caullery and Mesnil in 1898.

There are four species recognised in this genus.

The type species is Siedleckia nematoides.

The taxonomic position of this genus is unclear and it may be related to the gregarines or to the coccidians.

== Description ==
The gamonts are elongated and flattened. They possess a smooth surface lacking any grooves or folds.

The pellicle appears to be trilaminar and longitudinal microtubules lie deep to it. The parasite attaches to the host cell via mucron.

Feeding mode is apparently by myzocytosis.

== Life cycle ==
The parasite infects the gastrointestinal tract and is presumably transmitted by the orofaecal route but the details of this mechanism are presently unknown.

Species in this genus infect the polychete worm Scoloplos armiger.
