= Meroselenidium =

Scientific classification
- Domain: Eukaryota
- Clade: Sar
- Superphylum: Alveolata
- Phylum: Apicomplexa
- Class: Conoidasida
- Order: Archigregarinorida
- Family: Selenidioididae
- Genus: Meroselenidium; Mackinnon & Ray, 1933
- Species: M. keilini

Binomial name
- Meroselenidium keilini Mackinnon & Ray, 1933

Genus of single-celled organisms

Meroselenidium is a genus of parasitic alveolates in the phylum Apicomplexa. Species in this genus infect marine invertebrates.

== Taxonomy ==
This genus was described by Mackinnon and Ray in 1933. There is one species in this genus – Meroselenidium keilini.

== Description ==
The trophozoites live within the gut lumen. They measure 200–300 μm × 40–70 μm. There are 30–40 grooves along the body. Four refringent rods are present in the mucron. A vacuole may also be present in the mucron.

Schizogony occurs in the intestinal epithelium and gives rise to multiple merozoites.

Synergy is caudo-caudal. The gametocysts are 70 μm × 55 μm and give rise to multiple gametes. After fertilization the zygote gives rise to ~20 sporocysts. There is no residual body. The sporocysts are bivalved and give rise to multiple sporozoites.

The species in this genus, Merselenidium keilini, forms transversely striated folds.

== Life cycle ==
This species infects the anterior intestine of the polychaete Potamilla reniformis.

The parasite infects the gastrointestinal tract and is presumably transmitted by the orofaecal route but the details of this mechanism are presently unknown.
