= Syncystidae =

Scientific classification
- Domain: Eukaryota
- Clade: Sar
- Superphylum: Alveolata
- Phylum: Apicomplexa
- Class: Conoidasida
- Order: Neogregarinorida
- Family: Syncystidae; Schneider, 1886

Genera
- Syncystis

Family of single-celled organisms

The Syncystidae are a family of parasitic alveolates in the phylum Apicomplexa. Species in this family infect insects (Aeshnidae).

== History ==
This family was described by Schneider in 1886.

== Taxonomy ==
One genus and two species (Syncystis aeshnae, Syncystis mirabilis) are currently recognised in this family.

The type species is Syncystis mirabilis Schneider 1886.
