= Parasitic disease =

- Other names: parasitosis, parasitic infection
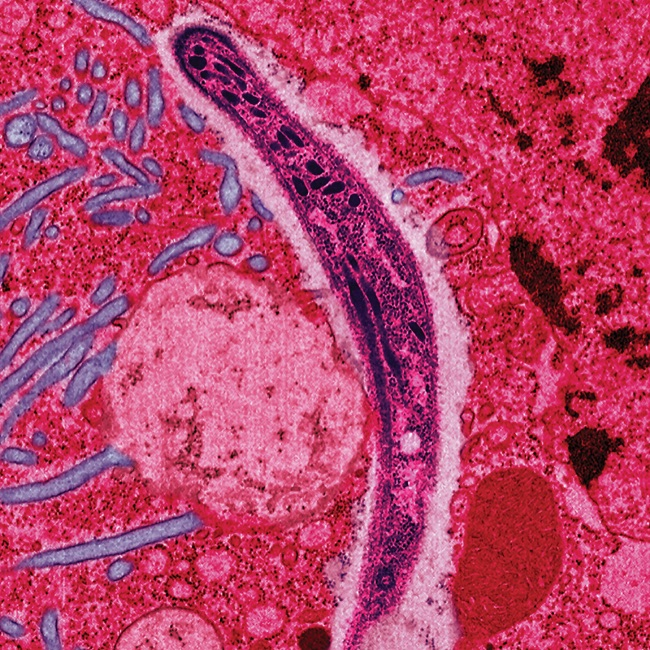
- False-color electron micrograph of a Plasmodium sporozoite
- Specialty: Infectious disease

A parasitic disease, also known as parasitosis, is an infectious disease caused by parasites. Parasites are organisms which derive sustenance from its host while causing it harm. The study of parasites and parasitic diseases is known as parasitology. Medical parasitology is concerned with three major groups of parasites: parasitic protozoa, helminths, and parasitic arthropods. Parasitic diseases are thus considered those diseases that are caused by pathogens belonging taxonomically to either the animal kingdom, or the protozoan kingdom.

== Terminology ==
Although organisms such as bacteria function as parasites, the usage of the term "parasitic disease" is usually more restricted. The three main types of organisms causing these conditions are protozoa (causing protozoan infection), helminths (helminthiasis), and ectoparasites. Protozoa and helminths are usually endoparasites (usually living inside the body of the host), while ectoparasites usually live on the surface of the host. Protozoa are single-celled, microscopic organisms that belong to the kingdom Protista. Helminths on the other hand are macroscopic, multicellular organisms that belong to the kingdom Animalia. Protozoans obtain their required nutrients through pinocytosis and phagocytosis. Helminths of class Cestoidea and Trematoda absorb nutrients, whereas nematodes obtain needed nourishment through ingestion. Occasionally the definition of "parasitic disease" is restricted to diseases due to endoparasites.

Some parasitic diseases can occur in either an acute or chronic form. The acute form is characterized by quicker and often more severe onset of symptoms. The chronic form is typically less severe but is life-long. Some parasites that cause chronic and acute manifestations in their respective diseases are:

- Trypanosoma brucei rhodesiense (acute) / Trypanosoma brucei gambiense (chronic)
- Trypanosoma cruzi
- Clonorchis sinensis
- Paragonimus westermani

== Transmission ==
=== Infection ===
Mammals can get parasites from contaminated food or water, bug bites, sexual contact, or contact with animals.

Some ways in which people may acquire parasitic infections are walking barefoot, inadequate disposal of feces, lack of hygiene, close contact with someone carrying specific parasites, and eating undercooked foods, unwashed fruits and vegetables or foods from contaminated regions. Only at specific stages in a parasites life is it infectious. Contact with non-infective stages will not lead to infection.

Many parasites utilize vectors to infect hosts. Vectors are vessels for the parasite, and help the parasite infect its next host. Some examples of parasitic diseases that use vectors are malaria and leishmaniasis.

==== At-risk groups ====
Many parasitic diseases are concentrated in specific areas of the globe. Majority of these diseases are prevalent along the equator due to the warm temperatures. Therefore, people located in these areas are at greater risk of contracting the disease causing parasites.

Parasitic diseases are far more common among marginalized groups. Lack of indoor bathrooms and access to clean drinking water are only some of the risk factors faced. Additionally, in the United States being Hispanic or African-American have shown to be risk factors for specific parasitic diseases.

== Morbidity ==
=== Symptoms ===
Parasitic diseases can manifest in many different symptoms, with some being asymptomatic. Many of the symptoms of parasitic diseases are common among other ailments, such as food poisoning or the flu. This can cause correct diagnoses to take a while. The target organ(s) of the parasite typically dictates the symptoms experienced:

==== General ====
- Fever
- Ulcers/lesions
- Death
- Headache
- Malaise
- Anemia
- Muscle Pain

==== Gastrointestinal Tract ====
- Dysentery
- Constipation
- Abdominal pain
- Vomiting
- Nausea
- Bloating
- Anorexia

==== Lungs ====
- Cough
- Blood in sputum
- Lesions

==== Skin ====
- Local inflammation
- Local dermatitis
- Hives
- Itching
- Rash

== Treatment ==
=== Diagnosis ===
Different parasitic diseases require different diagnostic methods because different parasites have different diagnostic stages. Testing routes will often be determined by symptoms.

==== Testing ====
- Stool Test
- Blood Test
- Colonoscopy/Endoscopy
- X-ray/MRI/ CT Scan

=== Therapies ===
Parasitic infections can usually be treated with antiparasitic drugs. The use of viruses to treat infections caused by protozoa has been proposed.

== See also ==
- Protozoan infection
- Babesiosis
- Giardiasis
