= Cryptonephridium =

In insect anatomy, a cryptonephridium is a structure present in most larval Lepidoptera and in other insects (i.e., Coleoptera) inhabiting relatively arid environments.

The Malpighian tubules are not free in the hemocele but are bound to the wall of the rectum by the perinephric membrane. This structure allows efficient resorption of water from diuresis and absorption of atmospheric water that is present in the hindgut as humidity. An adaptation for water conservation.
