= Caulleryella =

Scientific classification
- Domain: Eukaryota
- Clade: Sar
- Clade: Alveolata
- Phylum: Apicomplexa
- Class: Conoidasida
- Order: Neogregarinida
- Family: Caulleryellidae
- Genus: Caulleryella; Keilin, 1914

Species
- Caulleryella annulatae Caulleryella anophelis Caulleryella aphiochaetae Caulleryella maligna Caulleryella pipientis

Genus of single-celled organisms

Caulleryella is a genus of parasitic alveolates of the phylum Apicomplexa. Species in this genus infect insects (Diptera).

== Taxonomy ==
This genus was described by David Keilin in 1914. The genus was named after Professor Maurice Caullery at the Laboratoire d’Evolution des Etres Organises in Paris.

There are five species currently recognised in this genus.

The type species is Caulleryella aphiochaetae.

== Description ==
The species in this genus are spread by the orofaecal route. They infect the epithelium of the gut.

The sporozoites are elongate and attach to intestinal epithelium.

The trophozoites are flask shaped and have the neck embedded in the host cell.

During merogony the cell becomes spheroidal with peripheral nuclei.

Cytokinesis occurs to yield a bouquet of merozoites attached at one end to a residuum.

The gamonts are spheroidal. They pair and fuse

A common wall forms around the juxtaposed gamonts forming a gametocyst within which the two gamonts are termed gametocytes.

Each pair of gamocytes give rise to 16 isogametes. These in their turn pair and fuse to form 8 zygotes.

The zygotes also undergo cytokinesis by a progression of cleavage furrows from one end.

This leads to the formation of 8 sporozoites attached to a single polar residuum.

These may infect other cells within the gut or form a cyst which is released from the gut.
