= Veloxidium =

Scientific classification
- Domain: Eukaryota
- Clade: Sar
- Superphylum: Alveolata
- Phylum: Apicomplexa
- Class: Conoidasida
- Order: Archigregarinorida
- Family: Selenidioididae
- Genus: Veloxidium; Wakeman & Leander, 2012
- Species: V. leptosynaptae

Binomial name
- Veloxidium leptosynaptae Wakeman & Leander, 2012

Genus of single-celled organisms

Veloxidium is a genus of parasitic alveolates in the phylum Apicomplexa. Species in this genus infect marine invertebrates.

== Taxonomy ==
This species was described in 2012 by Wakeman and Leander.

There is one species in this genus - Veloxidium leptosynaptae.

== Description ==
This species infects the sea cucumber Leptosynapta clarki.

== Life cycle ==
The parasite infects the gastrointestinal tract and is presumably transmitted by the orofaecal route but the details of this mechanism are presently unknown.
