= Caulleryellidae =

Scientific classification
- Domain: Eukaryota
- Clade: Sar
- Clade: Alveolata
- Phylum: Apicomplexa
- Class: Conoidasida
- Order: Neogregarinida
- Family: Caulleryellidae; Keilin, 1914

Genera
- Caulleryella; Tipulocystis

Family of single-celled organisms

The Caulleryellidae are a family of parasites in the phylum Apicomplexa. Species in this family mostly infect dipteran larvae.

== History ==
This family was described by the parasitologist David Keilin in 1914.

== Taxonomy ==
Two genera are placed in this family - Caulleryella with five species and Tipulocystis with one. The type species is Caulleryellida aphiochaetae.

== Lifecycle ==
Species in the family are generally spread by the oral-faecal route. Replication occurs in the gut. Development is extracellular. The parasites develop attached to the host cell by an epimerite. Merogony occurs when nuclei are peripheral within the cell. The merozoites form a bouquet structure around the parent cell.

The gamonts are elongated with an anterior neck. The gametes have similar morphology. The gametocysts give rise to one to eight oocysts.
