= Ophryocystidae =

Scientific classification
- Domain: Eukaryota
- Supergroup: Alveolata
- Phylum: Apicomplexa
- Class: Conoidasida
- Order: Neogregarinorida
- Suborder: Schizogregarinina
- Family: Ophryocystidae; Leger & Duboscq, 1908

Genera
- Ophryocystis

Family of single-celled organisms

The Ophryocystidae are a family of parasites in the phylum Apicomplexa. Species in this family infect insects (Coleoptera and Lepidoptera).

== History ==
This family was described by Léger and Duboscq in 1908.

== Taxonomy ==
One genus is placed in this family - Ophryocystis - with at least 10 species. This is the type family of the order Neogregarinorida.
