= Exoschizon =

Scientific classification
- Domain: Eukaryota
- Clade: Sar
- Clade: Alveolata
- Phylum: Apicomplexa
- Class: Conoidasida
- Order: Archigregarinorida
- Family: Exoschizonidae; Levine, 1971
- Genus: Exoschizon; Hukui, 1939
- Species: E. siphonosomae

Binomial name
- Exoschizon siphonosomae Hukui, 1939

Genus of single-celled organisms

Exoschizon is a genus in the phylum Apicomplexa. It is the only genus in the family Exoschizonidae.

== History ==
Exoschizonidae was described by Levine in 1971.

== Taxonomy ==
Exoschizon is the only genus currently recognised in the family Exoschizonidae. The genus has only one species - Exoschizon siphonosomae - which was described by Hukui in 1939.

== Description ==
This species was found in the intestine of a sipunculid worm (Siphonosoma cumanense) in Japan.

The meronts measure 90 µm × 15 µm. There are ~13 longitudinal striations per side.

The meronts and gamonts are similarly shaped.

Transmission is presumably by the orofaecal route.
