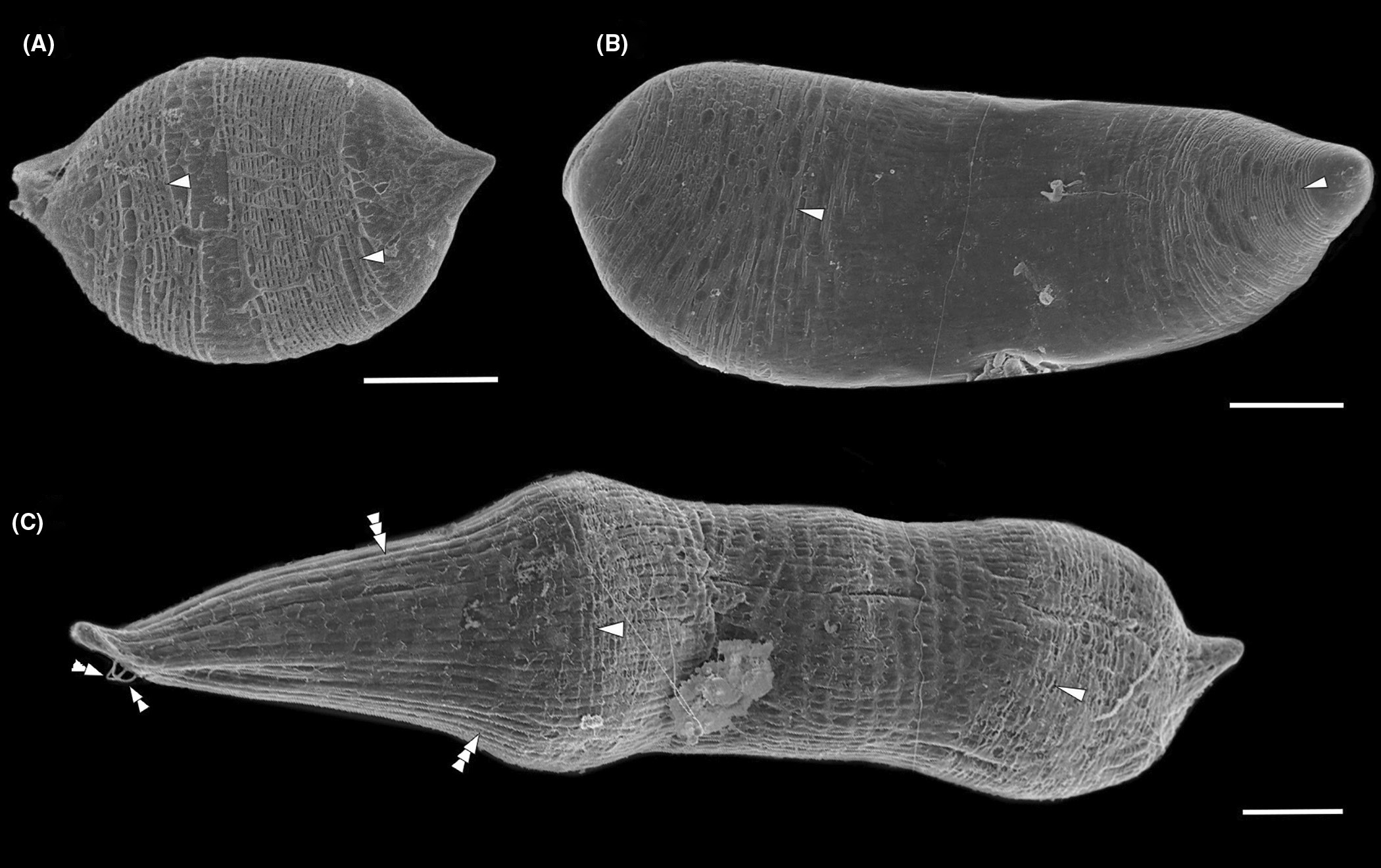
- Scanning electron micrographs of Platyproteum vivax

Scientific classification
- Domain: Eukaryota
- Clade: Sar
- Clade: Alveolata
- Class: Squirmidea
- Order: Squirmida
- Family: Platyproteidae; Cavalier-Smith 2014
- Genus: Platyproteum; Rueckert & Leander 2009

Type species
- Platyproteum vivax (Gunderson & Small 1986) Rueckert & Leander 2009

Species
- P. vivax (Gunderson & Small 1986) Rueckert & Leander 2009; P. noduliferae Yokouchi et al. 2022

= Platyproteum =

Genus of single-celled organisms

Platyproteum is a genus of parasitic alveolates in Squirmida.

== Taxonomy ==
This genus was described in 2009 by Sonja Reuckert and Brian Leander.

Type species of this genus is Platyproteum vivax. This species was moved from the genus Selenidium. The second species Platyproteum noduliferae was described in 2022. It belongs to Squirmida.

== Description ==
The trophozoite of Platyproteum temporarily exhibits fine transverse striations; it is associated with peristaltic motility but lacks hair-like projections and longitudinal folds. It exhibits bending and peristaltic shape changes. Its asymmetrical and flattened rostrum can elongate. It has both lumenal and intracellular stages. No evidence has been found to suggest that it undergoes merogony.
