= Balantidiasis =

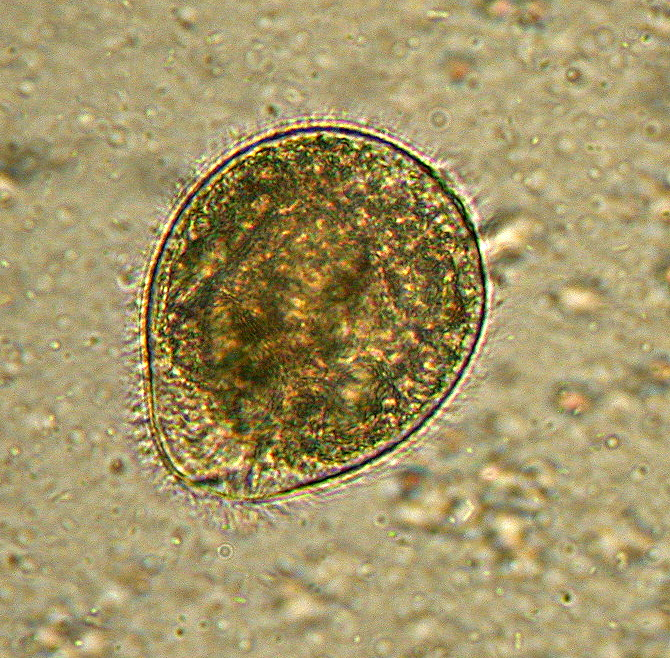
- Balantidium coli as seen in a wet mount of a stool specimen. The organism is surrounded by cilia.
- Specialty: Infectious disease

Balantidiasis is a protozoan infection caused by infection with Balantidium coli.

== History ==
The first study to generate balantidiasis in humans was undertaken by Cassagrandi and Barnagallo in 1896. However, this experiment was not successful in creating an infection and it was unclear whether Balantidium coli was the actual parasite used. The first case of balantidiasis in the Philippines, where it is the most common, was reported in 1904.

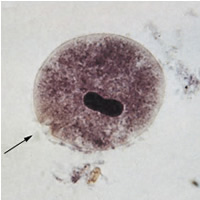
A trophozoite of Balantidium coli

Currently, Balantidium coli is distributed worldwide but less than 1% of the human population is infected. Pigs are a major reservoir of the parasite, and infection of humans occurs more frequently in areas where pigs commingle with people. This includes places like the Philippines, as previously mentioned, but also includes countries such as Bolivia and Papua New Guinea. Pigs are not the sole species capable of hosting B. coli. For example, the parasite also has a high rate of occurrence in rats. In a Japanese study that analyzed the fecal samples in 56 mammalian species, Balantidium coli was found to be present not just in all the wild boars tested (with wild boars and pigs being considered the same species), it was also found in five species of non-human primate: Chimpanzee (Pan troglodytes), White-handed gibbon (Hylobates lar), Squirrel monkey (Saimiri sciurea), Sacred baboon (Comopithecus hamadryas), and Japanese macaque (Macaca fuscata). In other studies, Balantidium coli has also been found in species from the order Carnivora.

== Signs and symptoms ==
Balantidiasis is usually asymptomatic in immunocompetent individuals, but if symptoms are present they may include:

- Intermittent diarrhea
- Constipation
- Vomiting
- Abdominal pain
- Anorexia
- Weight loss
- Fever
- Fatigue and weakness
- Headache
- Colon inflammation
- Marked fluid loss
- Prostate hyperplasia in males

The most common signs and symptoms are intermittent diarrhea and constipation or inflammation of the colon combined with abdominal cramps and bloody stools.

== Transmission ==
Balantidium is the only ciliated protozoan known to infect humans. Balantidiasis is a zoonotic disease and is acquired by humans via the fecal-oral route from the normal host, the pig, where it is asymptomatic. Fecally contaminated food and water are the common sources of infection in humans. Infection commonly occurs in areas with poor sanitation.

== Morphology ==
Balantidium coli exists in either of two developmental stages: trophozoites and cysts. In the trophozoite form, they can be oblong or spherical, and are typically 30 to 150 μm in length and 25 to 120 μm in width. It is its size at this stage that allows Balantidium coli to be characterized as the largest protozoan parasite of humans. Trophozoites possess both a macronucleus and a micronucleus, and both are usually visible. The macronucleus is large and sausage-shaped while the micronucleus is less prominent. At this stage, the organism is not infective but it can replicate by transverse binary fission.

In its cyst stage, the parasite takes on a smaller, more spherical shape, with a diameter of around 40 to 60 μm. Unlike the trophozoite, whose surface is covered only with cilia, the cyst form has a tough wall made of one or more layers. The cyst form also differs from the trophozoite form in being non-motile and does not undergo reproduction. The parasite must be ingested as a cyst to cause infection.

== Diagnosis ==
The diagnosis of balantidiasis can be an intricate process, partly because the related symptoms may or may not all be present at once. However, the diagnosis of balantidiasis can be considered when a patient has diarrhea combined with a probable history of current exposure to pigs (as pigs are the primary reservoir), contact with infected persons, or anal sexual contact. The diagnosis of balantidiasis can be made by microscopic examination of stools in search of trophozoites or cysts, or colonoscopy or sigmoidoscopy to obtain a biopsy specimen from the large intestine, which may provide evidence for the presence of trophozoites.

== Prevention ==
The best way to protect humans from balantidiosis is by properly treating water sources, including filtering or boiling water before use. Chlorine, at the concentrations normally used for municipal water treatment, is not effective against Balantidium cysts. In agricultural communities, where untreated water is often used for both drinking and irrigation, water treatment can help prevent improper consumption.

Food safety practices are also important for prevention. Pigs should be kept away from farming areas to reduce the risk of contamination. In addition, fresh fruits and vegetables grown in fields fertilized with animal manure should be thoroughly washed before consumption. Because Balantidium cysts can persist in contaminated soil and irrigation water, careful food cleaning is necessary to prevent ingestion of infectious components.

In regions where pigs are commonly raised, improved livestock management and animal housing practices can further prevent human infection. This can be accomplished by separating pig enclosures from living spaces and preventing animal waste from contaminating water. Proper manure management, including disposal or composting of pig feces, also helps limit environmental contamination and disrupts the transmission between animals and humans.

Lastly, community education and public health surveillance are critical components of prevention. Health education that promotes hygiene, safe food handling, and awareness of zoonotic transmission can help prevent infection. As always, monitoring people who work closely with pigs, such as farmers and slaughterhouse workers, may allow for earlier detection of infections and help prevent spread.

== Treatment ==
Balantidiasis can be treated with one of the standard protocols:

tetracycline 500mg 4x/day x 10 days

or

metronidazole 750mg 3x/day x 5 days

or

iodoquinol 650mg 3x/day x 20 days. 

Iodoquinol is effective against both the cyst and trophozoite stage of the parasite, but is limited to the gastrointestinal sites and is not effective when the infection disseminates outside because it is not well absorbed in blood plasma. nitazoxanide, paromomycin, chloroquine also have therapeutic effect.
