= Eugregarinorida =

Scientific classification
- Domain: Eukaryota
- Clade: Sar
- Clade: Alveolata
- Phylum: Apicomplexa
- Class: Conoidasida
- Subclass: Gregarinasina
- Order: Eugregarinorida; Léger 1900

Suborder
- Aseptatorina; Blastogregarinorina; Septatorina

Order of single-celled organisms

The Eugregarinorida are the most large and diverse order of gregarines — parasitic protists belonging to the phylum Apicomplexa. Eugregarines are found in marine, freshwater and terrestrial habitats. These species possess large trophozoites that are significantly different in morphology and behavior from the sporozoites. This taxon contains most of the known gregarine species.

These protozoa are common parasites of many invertebrates including insects and polychete worms.

== Taxonomy ==
Eugregarinorida has three recognised suborders: Aseptatorina, Blastogregarinorina and Septatorina. The intestinal eugregarines are separated into septate — suborder Septatina — and aseptate — suborder Aseptatina — depending on whether the trophozoite is superficially divided by a transverse septum. The marine gregarines are the most poorly studied members of this order.

The eugregarines have been classified into 27 families with ~244 genera, 14 of which have more than 25 species each.

There are ~900 species of septate gregarines and ~400 of aseptate.

=== Proposed revision ===
A revision to the taxonomy of this group has been proposed. Instead of the division into aseptate and septate taxa five new superfamilies have been proposed on the basis of 18s RNA studies. These are Actinocephaloidea, Stylocephaloidea s.str. (not in the sense of Clopton, 2009), Ancoroidea, Cephaloidophoroidea, Gregarinoidea and Lecudinoidea.

These proposed superfamilies have yet to reach general approval.

== Description ==
The trophozoites have lost the apical complex and instead possess a mucron (aseptate species) or an epimerite (septate species). The surface is inscribed by 90-300 epicytic folds resulting in stiff cells that are capable of gliding motility. However, a revision of the morphology of eugregarines has been proposed: they possess only the epimerite and epicytic crests (unlike the genuine mucron and longitudinal folds of Archigregarinorida).

Intestinal eugregarines are separated into septate (mostly terrestrial) and aseptate (mostly marine) gregarines, depending on whether the trophozoite cell is superficially marked by a transverse septum.

In the aseptate (or acephalate) species the cell is not divided. In the septate (or cephalate) species the body is divided into at least 2 parts: a posterior portion which contains the nucleus (the deutomerite) and an anterior portion (the protomerite), which forms the epimerite. In some species the deutomerite may be further subdivided.

== Life cycle ==
The transmission of the parasite to new host usually takes place by oral ingestion of oocysts in both aquatic and terrestrial environments. Transmission along with egg laying is also known.

The life cycle is completed in one host (monoxenous) with the exception of the Porosporicae whose life cycles involve a mollusc and a crustacean. After the oocysts are ingested by a suitable host, the sporozoites are released. These are haploid and usually number 8 per oocyte but may be as many as 16 or as few as 4 depending on the species. The sporozoite attaches to or penetrates the intestinal wall. In the latter case the sporozoite may remain within the intestinal wall or enter the body cavity. The sporozoites increase in size and develop into trophozoites. The trophozoites develop into gamonts which associate with each other. The gamonts may not be equal in size: in this case the smaller is referred to as the satellite and the larger as the primite. These are usually the largest stage of the life cycle.

The paired gamonts form a membrane around themselves (encystment) — a process known as syzygy. The resulting gametocyst is usually spherical in shape. Within the gametocyst the gamonts give rise to gametes which may be of similar size (isogametes) or different sizes (anisogametes). The gametes fuse in pairs and give rise to a zygote — the only diploid stage in the life cycle. The zygote forms an oocyst and within the oocyst, the sporozoites develop. The oocysts leave the gametocyst either via the latter's rupture or via sporoducts.

== See also ==
- Acephaline:

- Farlex: Acephaline
- Wiktionary: Acephaline
- Field, SG; Michiels, NK (2006). "Acephaline gregarine parasites (Monocystis sp.) are not transmitted sexually among their lumbricid earthworm hosts". J Parasitol. 92: 292–7. doi:10.1645/GE-643R.1. PMID 16729685.
