= Neogregarinorida =

Scientific classification
- Domain: Eukaryota
- Clade: Diaphoretickes
- Clade: SAR
- Clade: Alveolata
- Phylum: Apicomplexa
- Class: Conoidasida
- Subclass: Gregarinasina
- Order: Neogregarinorida; Grassé & Schrével 1953

Families
- Caulleryellidae; Gigaductidae; Lipotrophidae; Schizogregarinina; Ophryocystidae; Schizocystidae; Syncystidae

Order of single-celled organisms

The Neogregarinorida are an order of parasitic alveolates in the phylum Apicomplexa. Species in this order infect insects and are usually found in the fat body, hemolymph, hypodermis, intestine or Malpighian tubules. The most common site of infection is the fat body: many species are pathogenic for their hosts.

The species in this order are predominantly intracellular parasites.

== Taxonomy ==
Six families are in this order, with 13 genera. The type genus is Ophryocystis.

Two families (Ophryocystidae and Schizocystidae) belong to the suborder Schizogregarinina.

They appear to have evolved from the Eugregarinorida. Merogony as part of the life cycle separates them from the Eugregarinorida and appears to have been derived as a secondary characteristic.

A phylogenetic analysis of the small subunit RNA suggests Ophryocystis may actually be a eugregarine rather than a neogregarine.

== General characteristics ==
- Merogony, gamogony and sporogony are present in all species
- They are septate with deutomerites, epimerites and protomerites
- A conoidal complex is present through a major portion of their life cycles
- A mucron is formed from eversion of the conoidal complex similar to the eugregarines
- Merogony occurs by budding from the meront cell surface as in the coccidia
- Gamonts join in head-to-head syzygy (the conoidal complexes face each other)
