= Filipodium =

Scientific classification
- Domain: Eukaryota
- Clade: Sar
- Clade: Alveolata
- Class: Squirmidea
- Order: Squirmida
- Family: Filipodiidae; Cavalier-Smith 2014
- Genus: Filipodium; Hukui 1939

Type species
- Filipodium ozakai Hukui 1939

Species
- F. aspidosiphoni Tuzet & Ormières 1965; F. ozakai Hukui 1939; F. phascolosomae Rueckert & Leander 2009

Genus of single-celled organisms

The Filipodium is a genus of parasitic alveolates in Squirmida. This genus was described by Hukui in 1939.

== Taxonomy ==
It is a squirmid. The type species is Filipodium ozakai.

== Description ==
The trophonts of the genus Filipodium are covered with hair-like projections called cytopili and possess a high capacity for contraction, such as bending and twisting. These trophonts are supported by tubular extensions of the cortical alveoli but lack a microtubular or fibrillar axoneme. In some species, at least the cytopili are arranged longitudinally in every third or fifth longitudinal groove; the cell tip is flattened, can often expand laterally, and is triangular in shape with rounded corners, being wider than the body.

== Life cycle ==
The species infects sipunculid worms.
