= Mucron =

Attachment organelle of archigregarine cells

A mucron is an attachment organelle found in archigregarines—an order of epicellular parasitic Conoidasida.

The mucron is derived from the apical complex, which is found in all members of the phylum Apicomplexa.

The mucron is located at the anterior (apical) end of the cell and comprises the conoid, rhoptries, apical polar ring(s), and a large food vacuole (also called mucronal vacuole) having an outlet opening—a cytostome. It is used to attach and feed from the host's cell.

The epimerites of some aseptate eugregarines superficially (at the light microscopic level) resemble mucron and are usually called in the same way. This widespread misunderstanding originated from the conventional definition first proposed by Levine in 1971: "[the mucron is] an attachment organelle of aseptate gregarines. It is similar to an epimerite, but is not set off from the rest of the gregarine body by what appears under the light microscope to be a septum." Thus, it may be equally applied to archigregarines and aseptate eugregarines as both they are aseptate. Note that the genuine epimerites are usually not separated by septa from the rest of the cell, so this definition is misleading.
