= Trophozoite =

Activated, feeding stage in the life cycle of certain protozoa

A trophozoite (G. trope, nourishment + zoon, animal) is the activated, feeding stage in the life cycle of certain protozoa such as malaria-causing Plasmodium falciparum and those of the Giardia group. The complementary form of the trophozoite state is the thick-walled cyst form. They are often different from the cyst stage, which is a protective, dormant form of the protozoa. Trophozoites are often found in the host's body fluids and tissues and in many cases, they are the form of the protozoan that causes disease in the host. In the protozoan, Entamoeba histolytica it invades the intestinal mucosa of its host, causing dysentery, which aid in the trophozoites traveling to the liver and leading to the production of hepatic abscesses.

== Life cycle stages ==
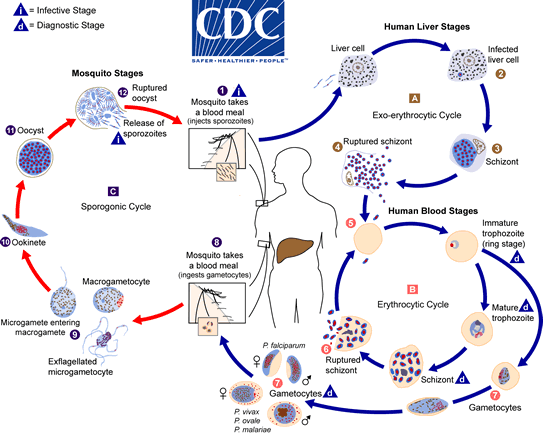
Malaria Lifecycle

=== Plasmodium falciparium ===
The causative organism of malaria is a protozoan, Plasmodium falciparium, that is carried by the female Anopheles mosquito. Malaria is recorded as the most common disease in Sub-Saharan Africa, and some Asian countries with the highest number of deaths. Studies have shown the increased prevalence of this disease since 2015. This protozoan has several other subspecies, with some causing diseases in humans causing over 91,000 falciparum malaria deaths in 2021, which is a 77% increase from 2020 as reported by the World Health Organization (WHO).

The malaria lifecycle is divided into two phases:

1. Human: The infected female mosquito (usually Anopheles species) bites a human and injects sporozoites into the bloodstream during a bloodmeal. The sporozoites travel to the liver where they invade liver cells (hepatocytes) in the Exo-erythrocytic Cycle. The sporozoites in the infected liver cells ruptures into schizonts which enter into the blood of the individual (Erythrocytic Cycle). The schizonts mature and divide asexually to form thousands of merozoites in the early trophozoite phase, which cause the malaria symptoms in humans. These mature and go through sexual reproduction, known as gametogenesis to produce the gametocytes (occurring in male and female forms) in the late trophozoite phase in the bloodstream that are picked up by other mosquitoes during blood meals.
2. Mosquito: The gametocytes, flagellated microgametocytes (males) and the unflagellated megagametocytes (females) are ingested during bloodmeal by mosquitoes, which then enter into the cyst phase, sporozoites, and undergo a series of asexual reproduction. After a span of 10–18 days, the sporozoite moves to the mosquito's salivary gland. In a subsequent blood meal on another human, anticoagulant saliva is injected along with the sporozoites, which then migrate to the liver, initiating a new cycle.

In the generalized apicomplexan life cycle the trophozoite undergoes schizogony (asexual reproduction) and develops into a schizont which contains merozoites.

=== Balantidium coli ===
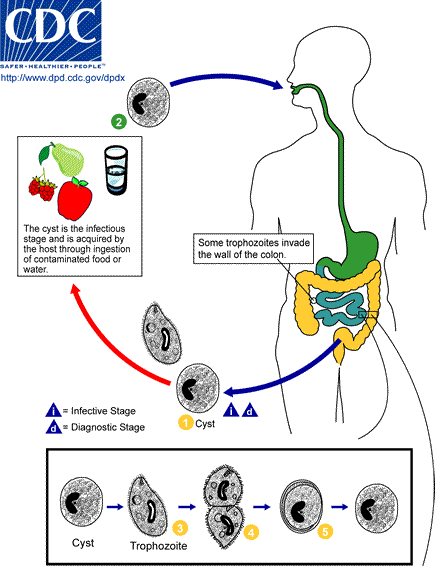
Life cycle of Balantidium coli

Balantidium coli is the causative agent of balantidiasis. B. coli trophozoites grow to approximately 150 micrometers in length.

=== Giardia ===
The trophozoite life stage of Giardia lamblia colonizes and proliferates in the small intestine. Trophozoites develop during the course of the infection into cysts which is the infectious life stage.
