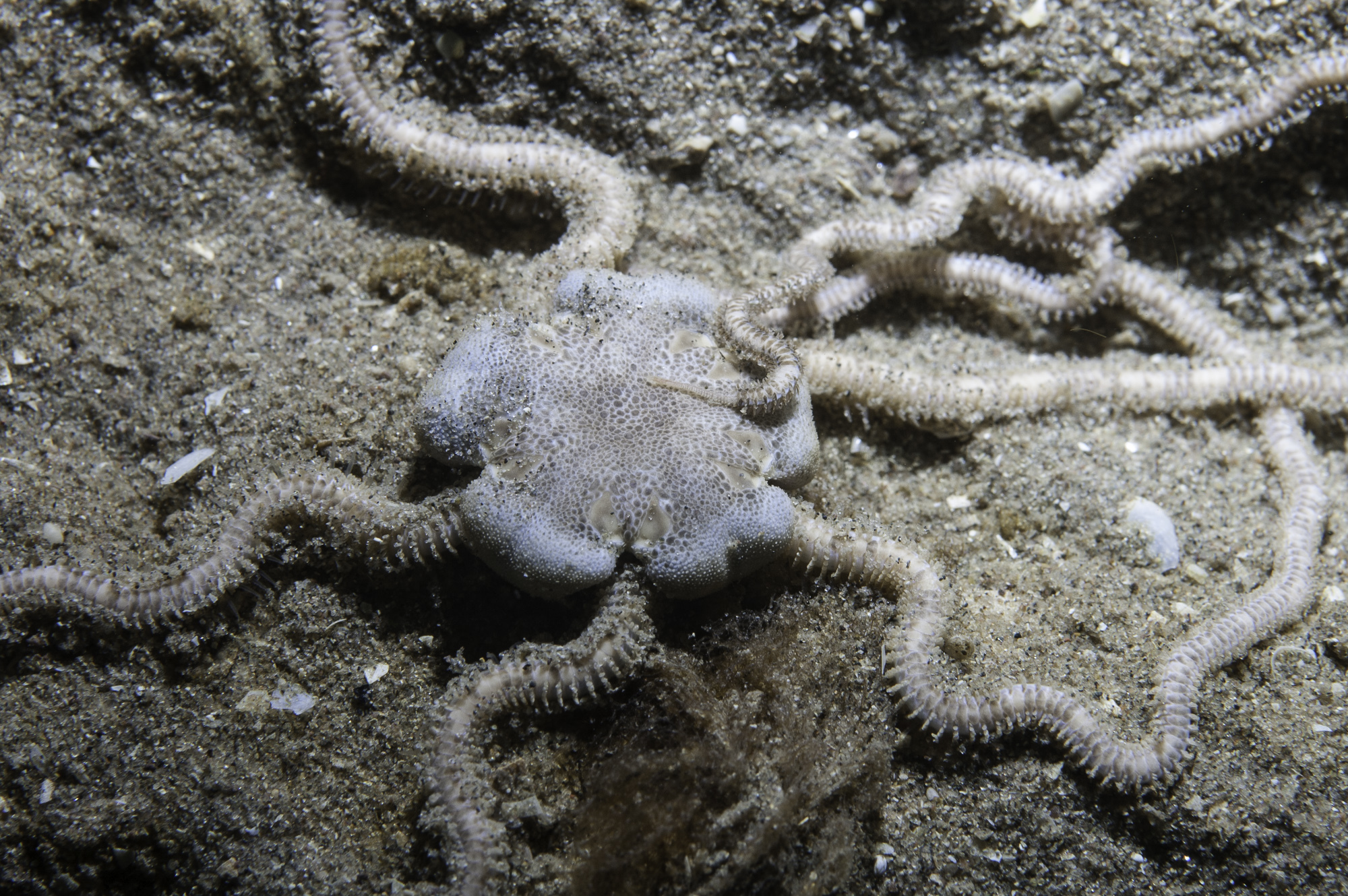

Scientific classification
- Kingdom: Animalia
- Phylum: Echinodermata
- Class: Ophiuroidea
- Order: Ophiurida
- Family: Amphiuridae
- Genus: Acrocnida
- Species: A. brachiata

Binomial name
- Acrocnida brachiata (Montagu, 1804)

Synonyms
- Acrocnida neapolitana (M. Sars, 1857); Amphiocnida brachiata (Montagu, 1804); Amphiura brachiata (Montagu, 1804); Amphiura neapolitana M. Sars, 1857); Asterias brachiata Montagu, 1804); Ophiocentrus brachiatus (Montagu, 1804); Ophiocoma brachiata (Montagu, 1804); Ophiura brachiata (Montagu, 1804)

= Acrocnida brachiata =

Species of brittle star

Acrocnida brachiata, the sand burrowing brittlestar, is a species of brittle star in the family Amphiuridae. It occurs on the seabed in the northeastern Atlantic Ocean and the North Sea, living semi-buried in the sand with only its arm tips projecting.

== Description ==
Acrocnida brachiata has a flat disc up to 12 mm (0.5 in) in diameter and five slender, clearly-demarcated, articulated arms up to 180 mm (7 in) in length. It is greyish-brown in colour. It can be distinguished from other similar species by the transverse furrows in the plates at the bases of the arms, the ventral scales bearing small tubercles and by the presence of an outer mouth papilla which is quite distinct from the paired papillae inside the mouth. The arms, which like other brittle stars flex sideways rather than up and down, have a pair of tentacle scales on each joint as well as numerous spines.

== Distribution and habitat ==
Acrocnida brachiata occurs in the northeastern Atlantic Ocean and North Sea. It is common round the coasts of the British Isles where its depth range is from the lower shore down to about 40 m (130 ft). It is a benthic species, living on sandy bottoms and burying itself in the sediment, with only the tips of its arms projecting. It often occurs in association with the burrowing sea urchin Echinocardium cordatum, commonly known as the sea potato.

== Taxonomy ==
There is a marked difference in morphology between populations in the intertidal zone and those thought to be the same species living in the subtidal zone. Study of these differences led to the describing of a new species Acrocnida spatulispina by Sabine Stöhr and Delphine Muths in 2009, for the deeper water individuals. The brittle stars in the genus Acrocnida show morphological affinities with Amphiura chiajei, but less with Amphiura filiformis.
