= Amphiodia urtica =

Scientific classification
- Kingdom: Animalia
- Phylum: Echinodermata
- Class: Ophiuroidea
- Order: Amphilepidida
- Family: Amphiuridae
- Genus: Amphiodia
- Species: A. urtica

Binomial name
- Amphiodia urtica (Lyman, 1860)

Synonyms
- Amphiodia barbarae (Lyman, 1875); Amphiura barbarae Lyman, 1875; Amphiura urtica Lyman, 1860

Species of echinoderm

Amphiodia urtica, commonly known as the burrowing brittle star or the long arm brittle star, is a species of brittle star belonging to the family Amphiuridae. It is found on the Pacific coast of North America at depths down to about 370 m (1,200 ft).

== Description ==
The central disc is pentagonal and up to 9 mm (0.4 in) in diameter. It has a somewhat inflated appearance and is scattered with small plates on the aboral (upper) side, with larger plates close to the paired radial shields at the base of the arms (rays). The five slender arms taper to a point and consist of a number of articulated joints each topped by an oval plate wider than it is long. There is a curved spine on this plate and three slightly flattened spines projecting laterally on either side of each joint on the arm. The length of each arm is from 12 to 21 times the diameter of the disc. The color of this brittle star is grayish-brown or reddish-brown, with a paler patch at the outer end of the radial shields.

== Distribution and habitat ==
Amphiodia urtica is native to the west coast of North America, its range extending from Alaska to Mexico. Although it can occur intertidally, it is more often in the subtidal zone at depths down to about 370 m (1,200 ft). It occurs on muddy bottoms where it immerses itself in the sediment, raising its arms into the water above to catch food particles floating by. On the continental shelf it can occur in large numbers.

== Ecology ==
This brittle star is predated by flatfish such as sole as well as by sand stars. The arms are most vulnerable and often get torn off or damaged, and both the arms and the aboral surface of the disc can be regenerated. The sexes are separate in this species, which commonly lives for five years. A polychaete worm, Malmgreniella lunulata, sometimes lives on the arms and a copepod sometimes inhabits the stomach.
