= Nudamphiura =

Scientific classification
- Kingdom: Animalia
- Phylum: Echinodermata
- Class: Ophiuroidea
- Order: Ophiurida
- Family: Amphiuridae
- Genus: Nudamphiura; Tommasi, 1965
- Species: N. carvalhoi

Binomial name
- Nudamphiura carvalhoi Tommasi, 1965

Genus of brittle stars

Nudamphiura is a genus of echinoderms. Nudamphiura was described by Luiz Roberto Tommasi in 1965. The only species is Nudamphiura carvalhoi.
