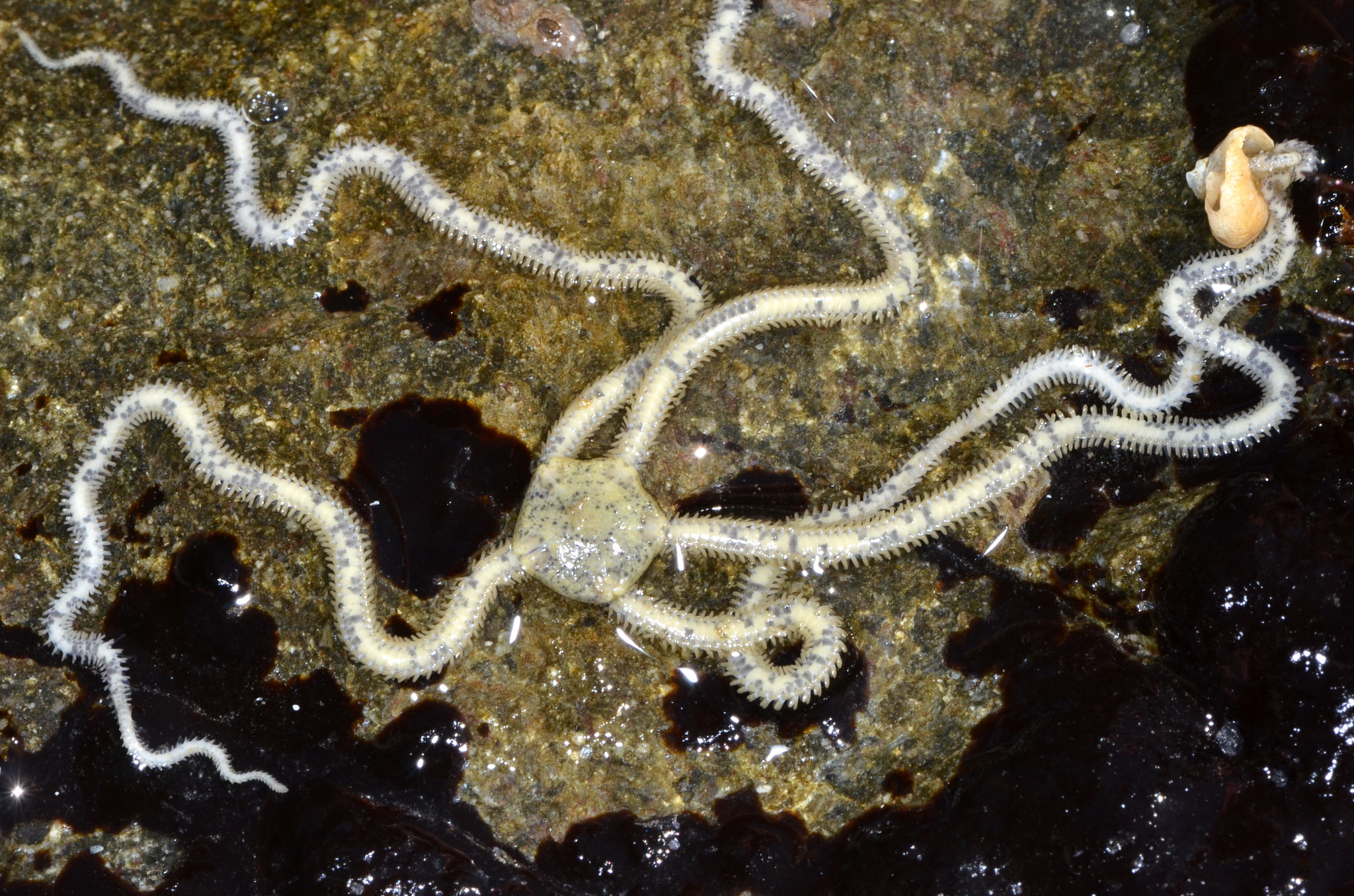

Scientific classification
- Kingdom: Animalia
- Phylum: Echinodermata
- Class: Ophiuroidea
- Order: Amphilepidida
- Family: Amphiuridae
- Genus: Amphiodia
- Species: A. occidentalis

Binomial name
- Amphiodia occidentalis (Lyman, 1860)

= Amphiodia occidentalis =

Species of brittle star

Amphiodia occidentalis, the long-armed brittle star, is a species of brittle star belonging to the family Amphiuridae. It is found in the Eastern Pacific coast from Alaska to USA, often on the seafloor within intertidal and subtidal zones. Within these areas, it is often found buried a few centimeters under the sand with 2 or 3 arms extending through the surface.

== Description ==
Amphiodia occidentalis exhibit pentaradial symmetry characteristic of brittle stars. They contain a flat disc body which can measure up to 11 mm in diameter that contains their organs. Five long, segmented arms at least eight times the diameter of the disc extend from the body which are covered in flattened spines and tube feet.

Additionally, they have a calcium carbonate endoskeleton composed of calcareous ossicles. Their central nervous system is highly metameric with the same pattern of peripheral nerves repeated in each arm.

== Locomotion ==
Instead of using their tube feet for locomotion, Amphiodia occidentalis and several other brittle star species use their arms to crawl along the substrate.

Despite their radial symmetry, they move using bilaterally symmetrical locomotion. Since they lack a locomotor anterior, they achieve this type of locomotion by employing two techniques: rowing and reverse rowing. The most common technique is the rowing technique, in which the center limb is in the front, towards the direction of movement, with the other limbs helping to move in the direction of the center limb. In reverse rowing, the center limb drags in the back, the opposite direction of movement, as the other limbs propel away from the center limb. In both techniques, the designated right and left forelimbs are highly synchronized while the hind limbs present greater variability. When changing directions, the disc does not rotate. Depending on the new direction, they designate the appropriate limb as the center limb and designate new identities to the other limbs corresponding to their position to the central limb. Rowing or reverse rowing is then utilized to move according to the new center limb.

== Diet ==
Amphiodia occidentalis are facultative detritivores, mainly eating detritus on the seafloor but can feed in other ways. By using their tube feet to catch food particles, they also engage in suspension feeding.

== Reproduction ==
Amphiodia occidentalis has separate sexes and are broadcast spawners, releasing their eggs and sperm into the water column where fertilization and larval development occurs as plankton Their breeding cycles are periodic with higher rates of spawning activity in the winter and spring.

== Life stages ==
Fertilized eggs of Amphiodia occidentalis are spherical, negatively buoyant, and surrounded by a thick hyaline layer and a fertilization envelope. The larvae exhibit bilateral symmetry but lack other characteristic structures of ophiopluteus larva (such as cilia, larval arms, paired larval spicules) setting them apart from other brittle stars. When they hatch out of the fertilization envelope as juveniles, they exhibit pentamerous radial symmetry. They also remain immotile for five days as they lack cilia and developed podia. At day eight after fertilization, they can use their podia for movement. They continue to grow and develop until they reach the adult stage.
