= Intoshia linei =

Scientific classification
- Domain: Eukaryota
- Kingdom: Animalia
- Phylum: Orthonectida
- Family: Rhopaluridae
- Genus: Intoshia
- Species: I. linei

Binomial name
- Intoshia linei Giard, 1877

Species of orthonectid

Intoshia linei is a species of parasitic worms belonging to the family Rhopaluridae.

It is the only species from the phylum Orthonectida which genome has been sequenced.
