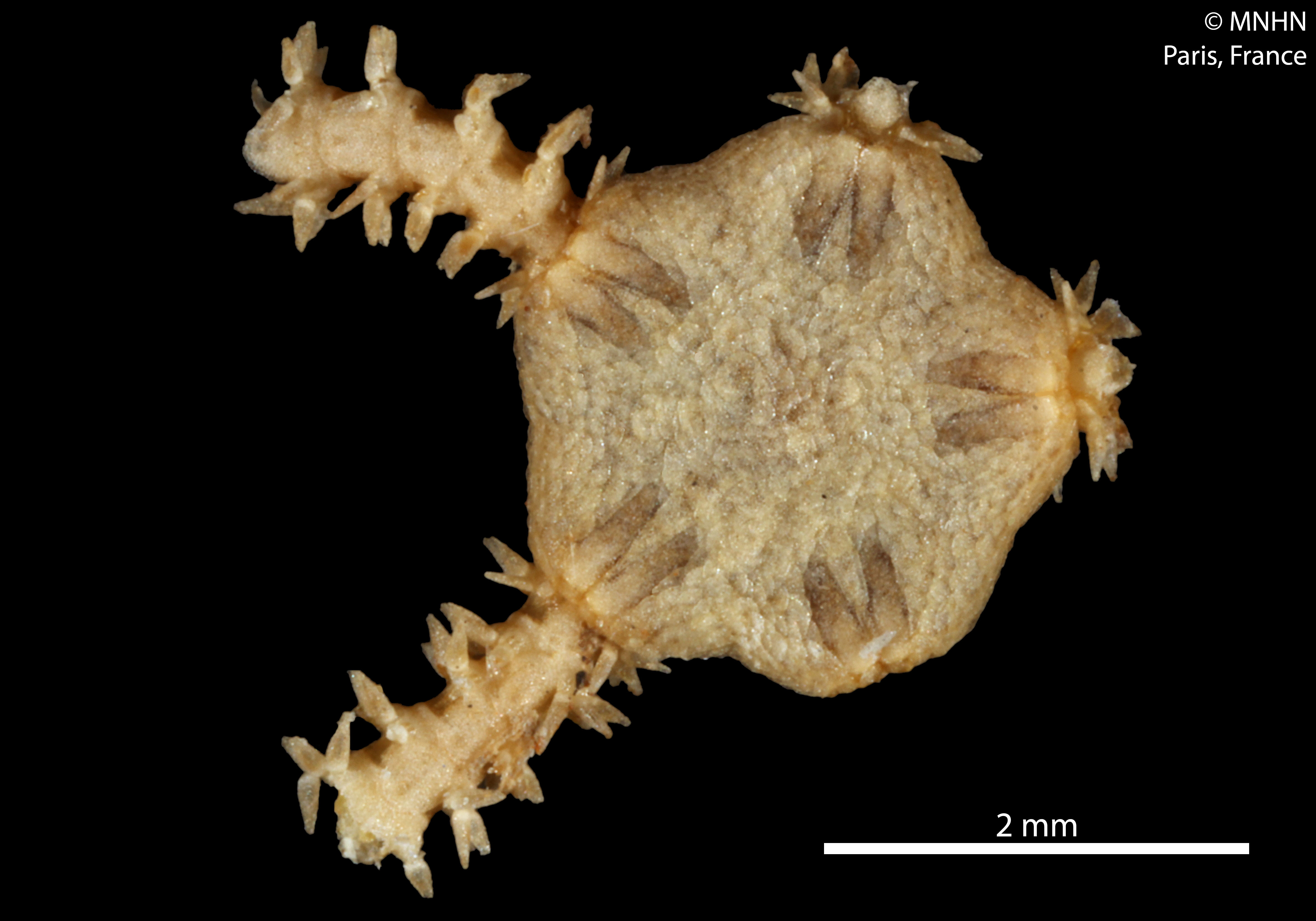

Scientific classification
- Kingdom: Animalia
- Phylum: Echinodermata
- Class: Ophiuroidea
- Order: Amphilepidida
- Family: Amphiuridae
- Genus: Amphiura; Forbes, 1843

Species
- See text

= Amphiura =

Genus of brittle stars

Amphiura is a large genus of brittle stars (Ophiuroidea) found in oceans worldwide, from tropics to Arctic and Antarctic regions.

== Systematics and phylogeny ==
Amphiura is a large genus that is currently divided into the following six subgenera: Amphioplus, Amphiura, Fellaria, Ophionema, Ophiopelte and Ophiopeltis. The once used subgenus Acrocnida has been elevated to a genus rank. The fossil record of the genus dates back to the Turonian (Amphiura plana).

== Species ==
Extant species include:

- Amphiura acacia
- Amphiura accedens
- Amphiura acrisia
- Amphiura adjecta
- Amphiura aestuarii
- Amphiura affinis
- Amphiura africana
- Amphiura agitata
- Amphiura alba
- Amphiura albella
- Amphiura algida
- Amphiura ambigua
- Amphiura amokurae
- Amphiura angularis
- Amphiura annulifera
- Amphiura anomala
- Amphiura anster
- Amphiura antarctica
- Amphiura arcystata
- Amphiura argentea
- Amphiura aster
- Amphiura atlantica
- Amphiura atlantidea
- Amphiura belgicae
- Amphiura bellis
- Amphiura benthica
- Amphiura beringiana
- Amphiura bidentata
- Amphiura bihamula
- Amphiura borealis
- Amphiura bountyia
- Amphiura brachyactis
- Amphiura brevipes
- Amphiura brevispina
- Amphiura callida
- Amphiura canadensis
- Amphiura candida
- Amphiura caparti
- Amphiura capensis
- Amphiura carchara
- Amphiura carnea
- Amphiura catephes
- Amphiura celata
- Amphiura ceramis
- Amphiura cherbonnieri
- Amphiura chiajei
- Amphiura clausadae
- Amphiura coacta
- Amphiura commutata
- Amphiura complanata
- Amphiura concinna
- Amphiura concolor
- Amphiura confinis
- Amphiura consors
- Amphiura constricta
- Amphiura corona
- Amphiura crassipes
- Amphiura crispa
- Amphiura crossota
- Amphiura crypta
- Amphiura dacunhae
- Amphiura debilis
- Amphiura deficiens
- Amphiura deichmanni
- Amphiura dejecta
- Amphiura dejectoides
- Amphiura delamarei
- Amphiura demissa
- Amphiura diacritica
- Amphiura diastata
- Amphiura diducta
- Amphiura digitula
- Amphiura dino
- Amphiura diomedeae
- Amphiura dispar
- Amphiura divaricata
- Amphiura dolia
- Amphiura duncani
- Amphiura ecnomiotata
- Amphiura elandiformis
- Amphiura eugeniae
- Amphiura eugenioides
- Amphiura exigua Verrill
- Amphiura fasciata
- Amphiura fibulata
- Amphiura ficta
- Amphiura filiformis
- Amphiura flexuosa
- Amphiura florifera
- Amphiura fragilis
- Amphiura frigida
- Amphiura gastracantha
- Amphiura glabra
- Amphiura goniodes
- Amphiura griegi
- Amphiura gymnogastra
- Amphiura gymnopora
- Amphiura heptacantha
- Amphiura heraldica
- Amphiura hilaris
- Amphiura immira
- Amphiura incana
- Amphiura inepta
- Amphiura ingolfiana
- Amphiura inhacensis
- Amphiura instans
- Amphiura iridoides
- Amphiura joubini
- Amphiura kalki
- Amphiura kandai
- Amphiura kinbergi
- Amphiura koreae
- Amphiura lanceolata
- Amphiura latispina
- Amphiura leptodoma
- Amphiura leptotata
- Amphiura leucaspis
- Amphiura levidevaspis
- Amphiura linearis
- Amphiura lorioli
- Amphiura luetkeni
- Amphiura lunaris
- Amphiura lymani
- Amphiura macrostyalia
- Amphiura maculata
- Amphiura madecassae
- Amphiura magellanica
- Amphiura magnisquama
- Amphiura maxima
- Amphiura mediterranea
- Amphiura megalaspi
- Amphiura micra
- Amphiura micraspis
- Amphiura microplax
- Amphiura microsoma
- Amphiura modesta
- Amphiura monorima
- Amphiura morosa
- Amphiura muelleri
- Amphiura multiremula
- Amphiura multispina
- Amphiura murex
- Amphiura nannodes
- Amphiura nociva
- Amphiura norae
- Amphiura notacantha
- Amphiura octacantha
- Amphiura otteri
- Amphiura pachybactra
- Amphiura papillata
- Amphiura parviscutata
- Amphiura perita
- Amphiura plantei
- Amphiura poecila
- Amphiura polita
- Amphiura polyacantha
- Amphiura praefecta
- Amphiura princeps
- Amphiura proposita
- Amphiura protecta
- Amphiura psilopora
- Amphiura ptena
- Amphiura pusilla
- Amphiura pycnostoma
- Amphiura rathbuni
- Amphiura reloncavii
- Amphiura repens
- Amphiura retusa
- Amphiura richardi
- Amphiura sarsi
- Amphiura scabiuscula
- Amphiura scabriuscula
- Amphiura sculpta
- Amphiura securigera
- Amphiura semiermis
- Amphiura seminuda
- Amphiura senegalensis
- Amphiura septa
- Amphiura septemspinosa
- Amphiura serpentina
- Amphiura sexradiata
- Amphiura simonsi
- Amphiura sinicola
- Amphiura spinipes
- Amphiura stepanovi
- Amphiura stictacantha
- Amphiura stimpsoni
- Amphiura subtilis
- Amphiura sundevalli
- Amphiura syntaracha
- Amphiura tenuis
- Amphiura tessellata
- Amphiura trachydisca
- Amphiura triaina
- Amphiura trisacantha
- Amphiura tumulosa
- Amphiura tutanekai
- Amphiura uncinata
- Amphiura ungulata
- Amphiura unicinata
- Amphiura ushakovi
- Amphiura vadicola
- Amphiura velox
- Amphiura verrilli
- Amphiura verticillata
