= Amphiodia habilis =

Scientific classification
- Domain: Eukaryota
- Kingdom: Animalia
- Phylum: Echinodermata
- Class: Ophiuroidea
- Order: Ophiurida
- Family: Amphiuridae
- Genus: Amphiodia
- Species: A. habilis

Binomial name
- Amphiodia habilis Albuquerque, Campos-Creasey & Guille, 2001

Species of brittle star

Amphiodia habilis is a species of brittle star belonging to the family Amphiuridae. It is only known from a single locality off the coast of southeastern Brazil, near the mouth of the Doce River.

This brittle star, with a disc diameter of 3.5 mm and arm length of 20 mm, can be most readily distinguished from congeners by the thick disc with large armoured plates on the upperside.
