= Lankesteria =

Lankesteria may refer to:

- Lankesteria (plant), a genus of plants in the family Acanthaceae
- Lankesteria (alveolate), a genus of protists in the family Lecudinidae
