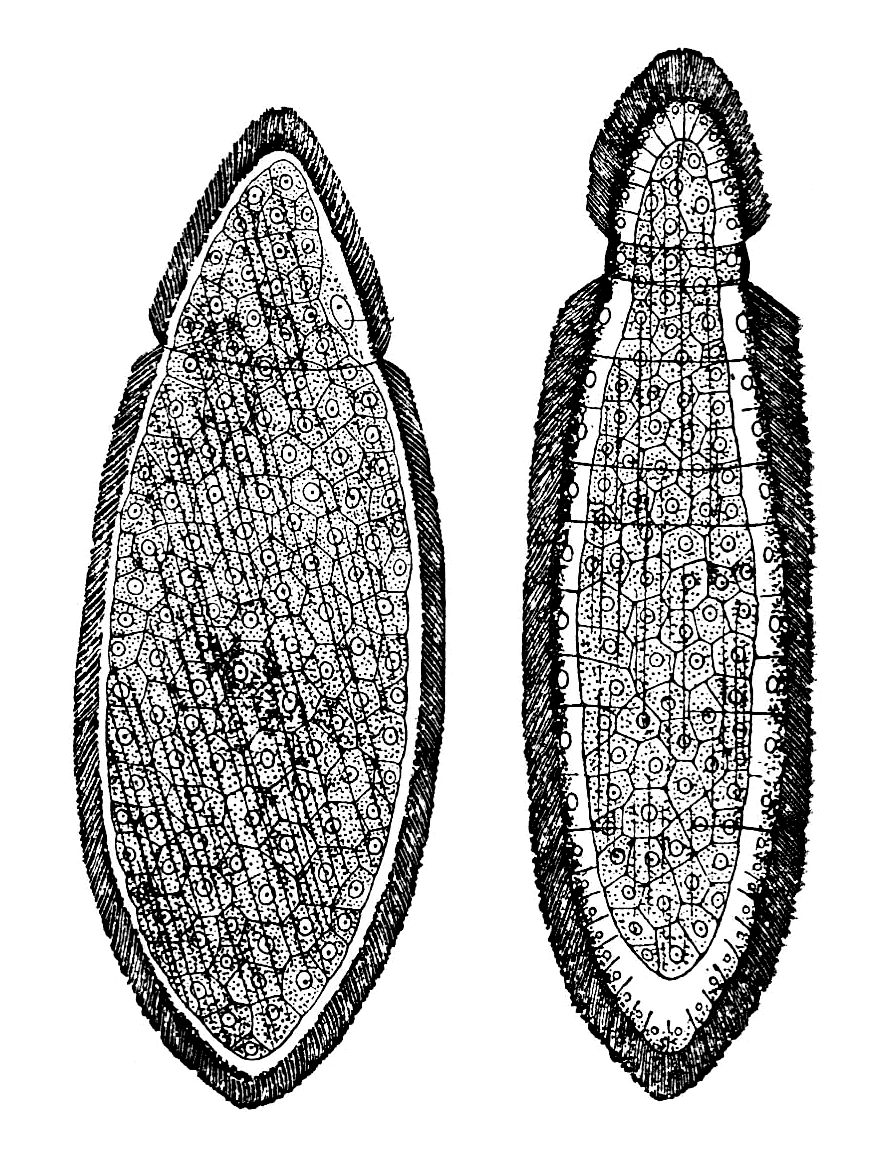
- Two different female Orthonectids

Scientific classification
- Kingdom: Animalia
- Subkingdom: Eumetazoa
- Clade: ParaHoxozoa
- Clade: Bilateria
- Clade: Nephrozoa
- Clade: Protostomia
- Clade: Spiralia
- Clade: Platytrochozoa
- Phylum: Orthonectida; Giard, 1877

Species
- See text

= Orthonectida =

Phylum of marine invertebrate parasites

Orthonectida (/ˌɔːrθəˈnɛktɪdə, -θoʊ-/) is a small phylum of poorly known parasites of marine invertebrates that are among the simplest of multi-cellular organisms. Members of this phylum are known as orthonectids.

== Biology ==
The non-feeding adults, which are the sexual stage, are microscopic wormlike animals, consisting of a single layer of ciliated outer cells surrounding a mass of sex cells. Their musculature and nervous system is very reduced. In Intoshia variabili, the adult females have 32 being muscle cells and 4 nerve cells, and the smaller male only halv of that, with 16 muscle cells and 2 nerve cells. They swim freely within the bodies of their hosts, which include flatworms, polychaete worms, bivalve molluscs, echinoderms, ribbon worms, acoels, Xenoturbellida, and chordates. Most are gonochoristic, with separate male and female individuals, but a few species are hermaphroditic.

When they are ready to reproduce, adults leave the host, and sperm from the males penetrate the bodies of the females to achieve internal fertilisation. The resulting zygote develops into a ciliated larva that escapes from the mother to seek out new hosts. Once it finds a host, the larva loses its cilia and develops into its multinucleated and plasmodial stage with a double membrane. This, in turn, breaks up into numerous individual cells called agametes (ameiotic generative cells) which grow into the next generation of adults.

== Classification ==
The phylum consists of about 20 known species, of which Rhopalura ophiocomae is the best-known. The phylum is not divided into classes or orders, and contains just two families.

Although originally described in 1877 as a class, and later characterized as an order of the phylum Mesozoa, a 1996 study has suggested that orthonectids are quite different from the rhombozoans, the other group in Mesozoa. The genome of one orthonectid species, Intoshia linei, has been sequenced. These animals are simplified spiralians. The genome data confirm earlier findings which allocated these organisms to Spiralia based on their morphology.

Their position in the spiralian phylogenetic tree has yet to be determined. Some work appears to relate them to the Annelida and, within the Annelida, finds them most closely allied to the Clitellata. On the other hand, a 2022 study compensating for long-branch attraction has recovered the traditional grouping of Orthonectida with rhombozoans in a monophyletic Mesozoa placed close to Platyhelminthes or Gnathifera. This supports a previous study which found orthonectids and rhombozoans to make a monophyletic taxon Mesozoa and form a clade with Rouphozoa (platyhelminths and gastrotrichs).

== Known species ==
Phylum Orthonectida

- Family Rhopaluridae Stunkard, 1937
  - Ciliocincta
    - Ciliocincta akkeshiensis Tajika, 1979 – Hokkaido, Japan; in flatworms (Turbellaria)
    - Ciliocincta julini (Caullery and Mesnil, 1899) – E North Atlantic, in polychaetes
    - Ciliocincta sabellariae Kozloff, 1965 – San Juan Islands, WA (USA); in polychaete (Neosabellaria cementarium)
  - Intoshia
    - Intoshia leptoplanae Giard, 1877 – E North Atlantic, in flatworms (Leptoplana)
    - Intoshia linei Giard, 1877 – E North Atlantic, in nemertines (Lineus) = Rhopalura linei
    - Intoshia major Shtein, 1953 – Arctic Ocean; in gastropods (Lepeta, Natica, Solariella) = Rhopalura major
    - Intoshia metchnikovi (Caullery & Mesnil, 1899) – E North Atlantic, in polychaetes and nemertines
    - Intoshia paraphanostomae (Westblad, 1942) – E North Atlantic, in flatworms (Acoela)
    - Intoshia variabili (Alexandrov & Sljusarev, 1992) – Arctic Ocean, in flatworms (Macrorhynchus)
  - Rhopalura
    - Rhopalura elongata Shtein, 1953 – Arctic Ocean, in bivalves (Astarte)
    - Rhopalura gigas (Giard, 1877)
    - Rhopalura granosa Atkins, 1933 – E North Atlantic, in bivalves (Pododesmus)
    - Rhopalura intoshi Metchnikoff – Mediterranean, in nemertines
    - Rhopalura litoralis Shtein, 1953 – Arctic Ocean, in gastropods (Lepeta, Natica, Solariella)
    - Rhopalura major Shtein, 1953
    - Rhopalura murmanica Shtein, 1953 – Arctic Ocean, in gastropods (Rissoa, Columbella)
    - Rhopalura ophiocomae Giard, 1877 – E North Atlantic, in ophiuroids (usually Amphipholis)
    - Rhopalura pelseneeri Caullery & Mesnil, 1901 – E North Atlantic, polychaetes and nemertines
    - Rhopalura philinae Lang, 1954 – E North Atlantic, in gastropods
    - Rhopalura pterocirri de Saint-Joseph, 1896 – E North Atlantic, in polychaetes
    - Rhopalura vermiculicola
  - Stoecharthrum
    - Stoecharthrum burresoni Kozloff, 1993
    - Stoecharthrum fosterae Kozloff, 1993
    - Stoecharthrum giardi Caullery & Mesnil, 1899 – E North Atlantic, in polychaetes
    - Stoecharthrum monnati Kozloff, 1993 – E North Atlantic, in molluscs
- Family Pelmatosphaeridae Stunkard, 1937
  - Pelmatosphaera
    - Pelmatosphaera polycirri Caullery and Mesnil, 1904 – E North Atlantic, in polychaetes and nemertines
