= Stefano delle Chiaje =

Italian zoologist, botanist, anatomist and physician

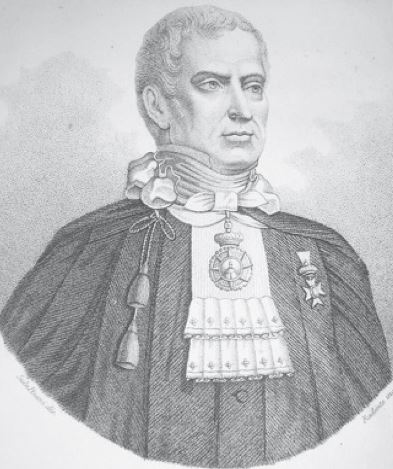
- Born: 25 April 1794
- Died: 18 December 1860 (aged 66)
- Education: University of Naples
- Known for: Work on medicinal plants, and on invertebrates
- Scientific career
- Fields: Zoologist, botanist, anatomist, physician
- Institutions: Museo di Anatomia Umana, Naples
- Author abbrev. (botany): Chiaje
- Author abbrev. (zoology): Chiaie

Stefano Delle Chiaje (25 April 1794 – 18 December 1860) was an Italian zoologist, botanist, anatomist and medical doctor.

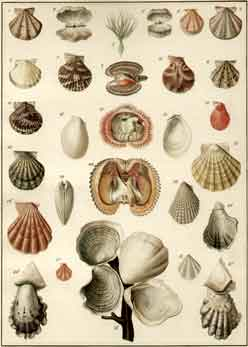
Bivalve shells collected by Poli and Delle Chiaie, in a plate from Poli's long-running series Testacea Utriusque Siciliae eorumque historia et anatome

Delle Chiaje studied medicine in Naples, where he was a pupil of Giuseppe Saverio Poli. Together they started compiling books on the bivalves and the gastropod molluscs of the Kingdom of the Two Sicilies. He later taught pathology and performed research in the field of malacology. He erected the genus of nemertean worms Polia, naming it in honour of Poli, and described Polia lineata and Polia siphunculus. The latter has since been synonymised with Cerebratulus marginatus, but Delle Chiaje's description shows an understanding of the animal's anatomy and recognition of its constituent parts that was missing among many of his contemporaries.

He made a study of the skeletons and detached bones found during the excavations of the buried city of Pompeii, making deductions on the health of the population, their characters and occupations, the types of injuries they suffered and the skill of their surgeons.

He is also remembered for his research in the field of botany, especially medicinal plants, and of zoology, with particular reference to the taxonomy of invertebrates of the Kingdom of Naples. In 1842 he was admitted as an associate to the Accademia nazionale delle scienze in Rome. From 1846 to 1860 he was the curator of the Museo di Anatomia Umana at Naples.

== Taxon named in his honor ==
The brittle star Amphiura chiajei, ascidian Cystodytes dellechiajei and nemertean worms Carinesta dellechiajei, Carinina dellechiajei and Quasimicrura dellechiajei were named in his honour.

== Some taxa named by Stefano delle Chiaje ==
- Amphipholis squamata, the brooding snake star and the dwarf brittle star.
- Acholoe squamosa, the polychaet worm.
- Actinia cari, the anemone.
- Astropecten jonstoni, the starfish.
- Balanoglossus, genus of the acorn worms.
- Baseodiscus delineatus, the nemertean worm.
- Polysiphonia denticulata, the red alga.
- Holothuria stellati, the sea cucumber.
- Tremoctopus violaceus, the octopus.
