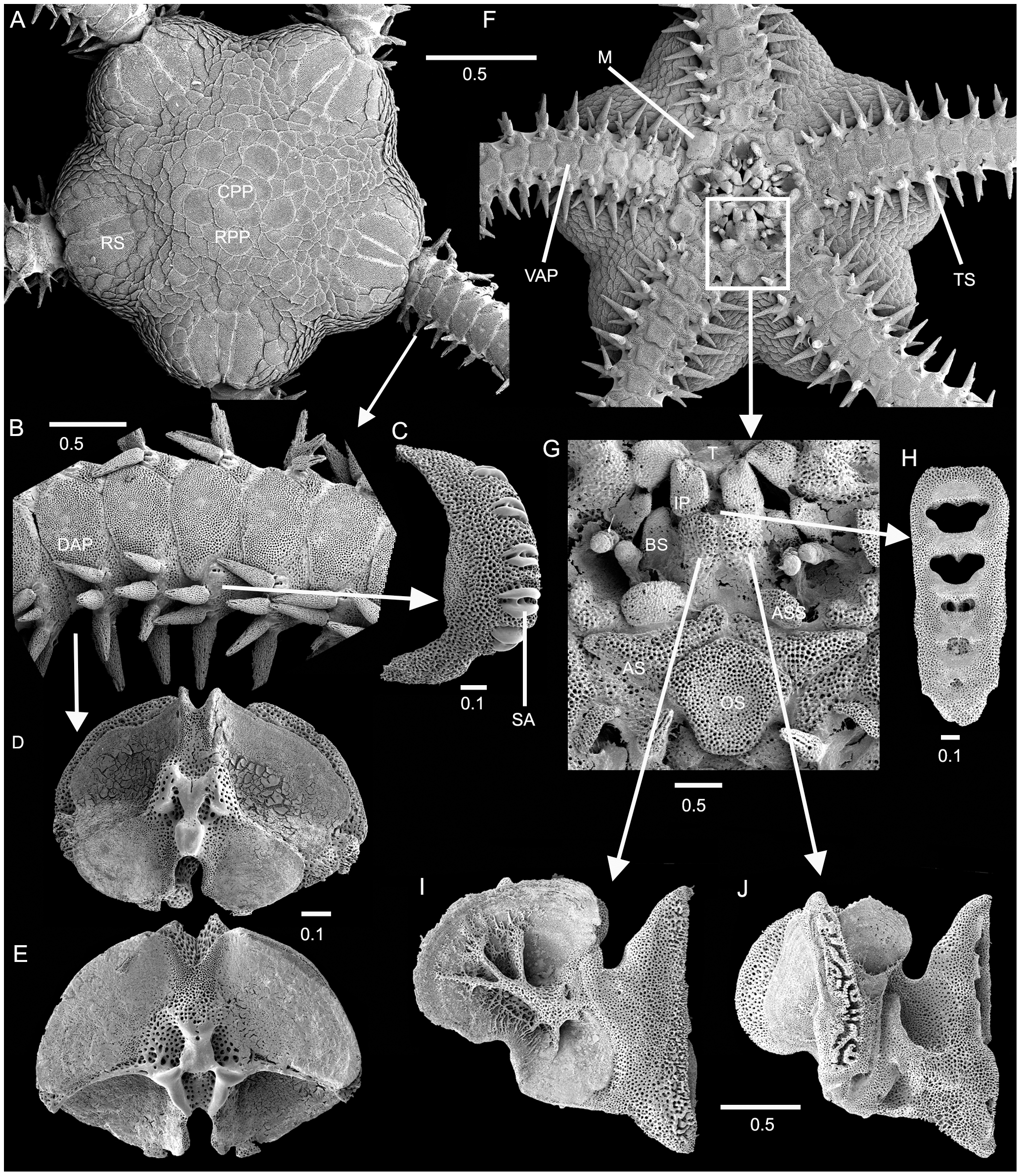

Scientific classification
- Kingdom: Animalia
- Phylum: Echinodermata
- Class: Ophiuroidea
- Order: Ophiurida
- Family: Amphiuridae
- Genus: Amphiura
- Species: A. chiajei

Binomial name
- Amphiura chiajei Forbes, 1843

Synonyms
- A. florifera Forbes, 1843; A. rancureli Tomasi, 1967

= Amphiura chiajei =

Species of brittle star

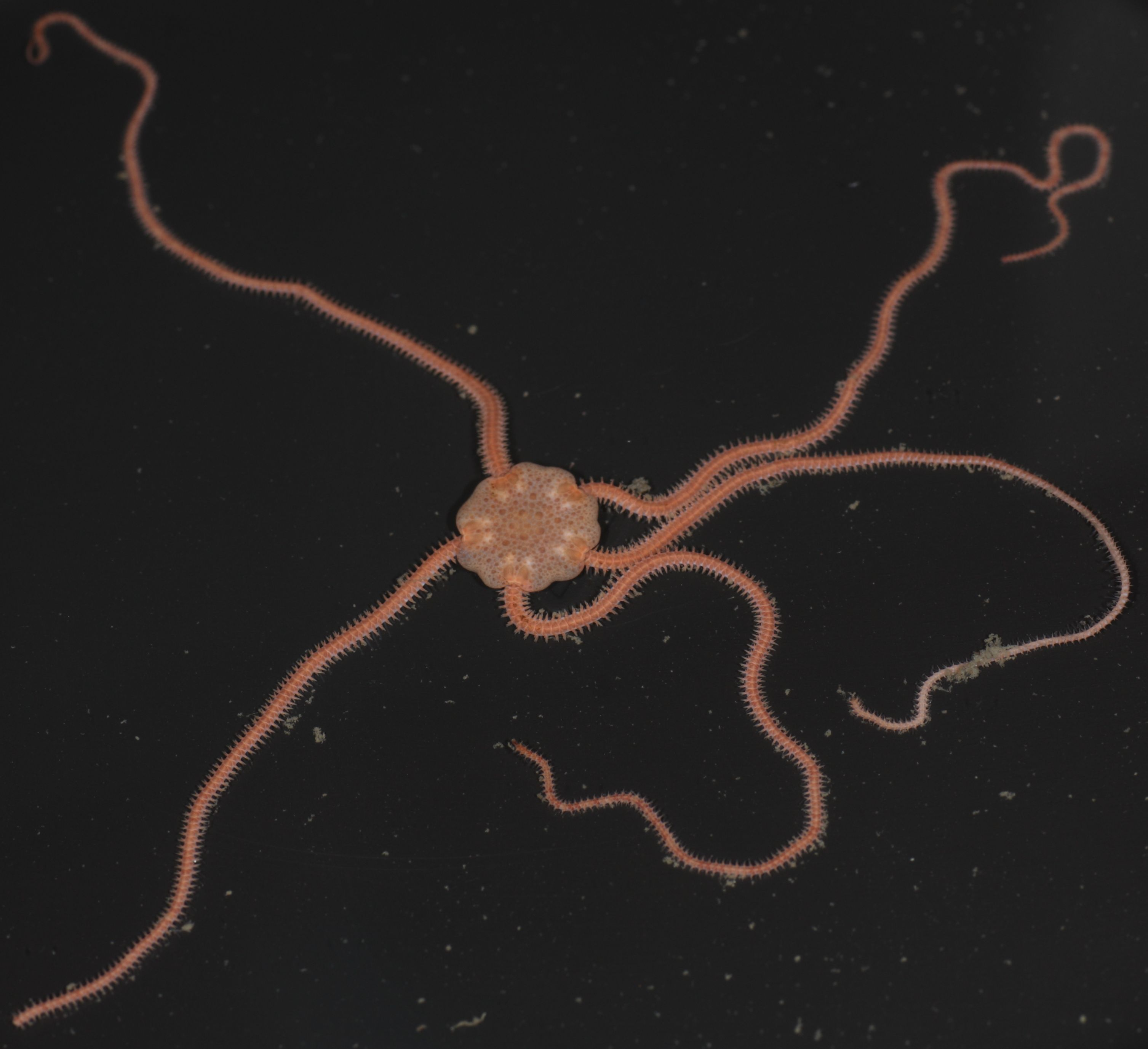
Amphiura chiajei overside

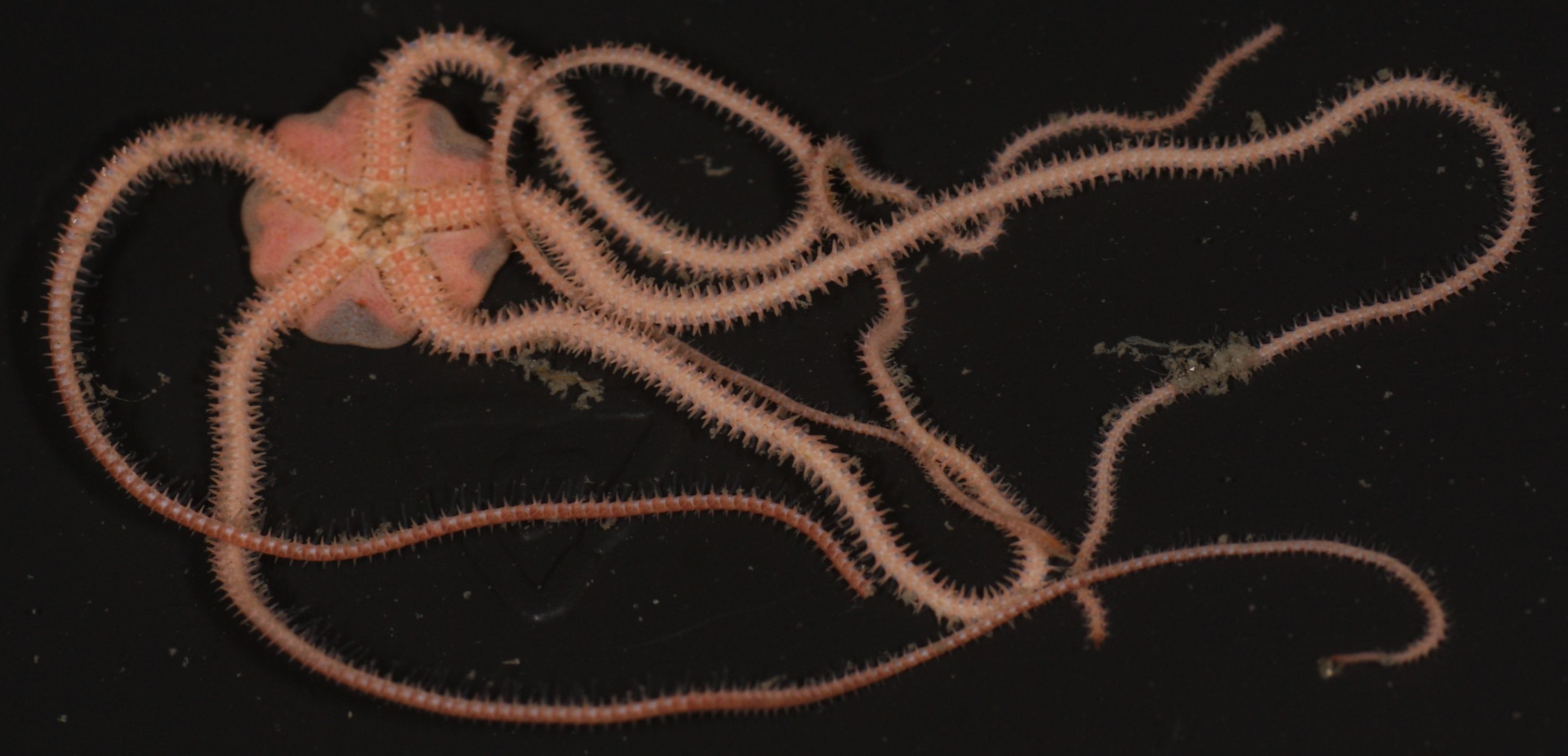
Amphiura chiajei underside

Amphiura chiajei is a species of brittle star belonging to the family Amphiuridae. It is found in the northeastern Atlantic Ocean and adjoining seas to a depth of 1,000 metres (3,300 ft). It digs itself into the soft sediment of the seabed and raises its arms into the water above to suspension feed on plankton. It was first described by the British naturalist Edward Forbes in 1843, and was named for the Italian zoologist Stefano Delle Chiaje (1794–1860).

== Description ==
Amphiura chiajei has a central disc and five slender arms and is pinkish or greyish brown. The disc is up to 11 mm (0.4 in) in diameter and the arms up to 88 mm (3 in) long. The dorsal surface of the disc is covered with scales, larger in the middle and smaller towards the margin. There are a pair of separate radial shields near the attachment of each of the arms. The arms are elongated and are composed of many segments with joints between them, each segment bearing four to six pairs of conical spines.

== Distribution and habitat ==
Amphiura chiajei is found in the northeastern Atlantic Ocean, the North Sea and the Mediterranean Sea. Its range extends from western Norway to the Azores and the west coast of North Africa. It is found on the seabed on sand or muddy sand at depths down to about 1,000 metres (3,300 ft).

== Ecology ==
Amphiura chiajei buries itself in the sediment with the disc at a depth of about 5 centimetres (2.0 in). It extends one or two arms above the sediment to gather food particles which are then transferred along its arm to its mouth. It is often found in the same locations as the heart urchin Brissopsis lyrifera, and where this happens it grows more slowly than it does elsewhere. This is thought to be because the urchin churns up the sediment excessively.

Amphiura chiajei becomes sexually mature at about four years of age and may live for ten years. The gonads grow in size over the winter and spring and broadcast spawning takes place in late summer and early autumn. The larvae drift with the current and settle on the seabed and undergo metamorphosis at around eight days. This short larval period means that their potential to disperse is limited. In a population off the coast of Northumberland during the period 1958 to 1964, all the individuals were large and there was no sign of juveniles. Then in 1965 a large number of young individuals joined the population, demonstrating that episodic recruitment is a feature of this brittle star.

In Loch Eil and Loch Linnhe, Scotland this species has become much more common in the last few decades of the 20th century. In the 1960s there was an average of about 50 individuals per square metre in suitable habitats, in the 1970s this had increased to over 300 per square metre. It is suggested that this build up in numbers was mainly due to the discharge of effluent from pulp mills. An increase in nutrients led to an increase in the number of plankton and, as suspension feeders, the brittle stars benefited from the increased food supply. The removal of organic particles by the brittle stars may have reduced the consequences of increased eutrophication for other organisms.

== See also ==
- Amphiuridae
- Brittle star
- Brissopsis lyrifera
- Suspension feeder
- Plankton
