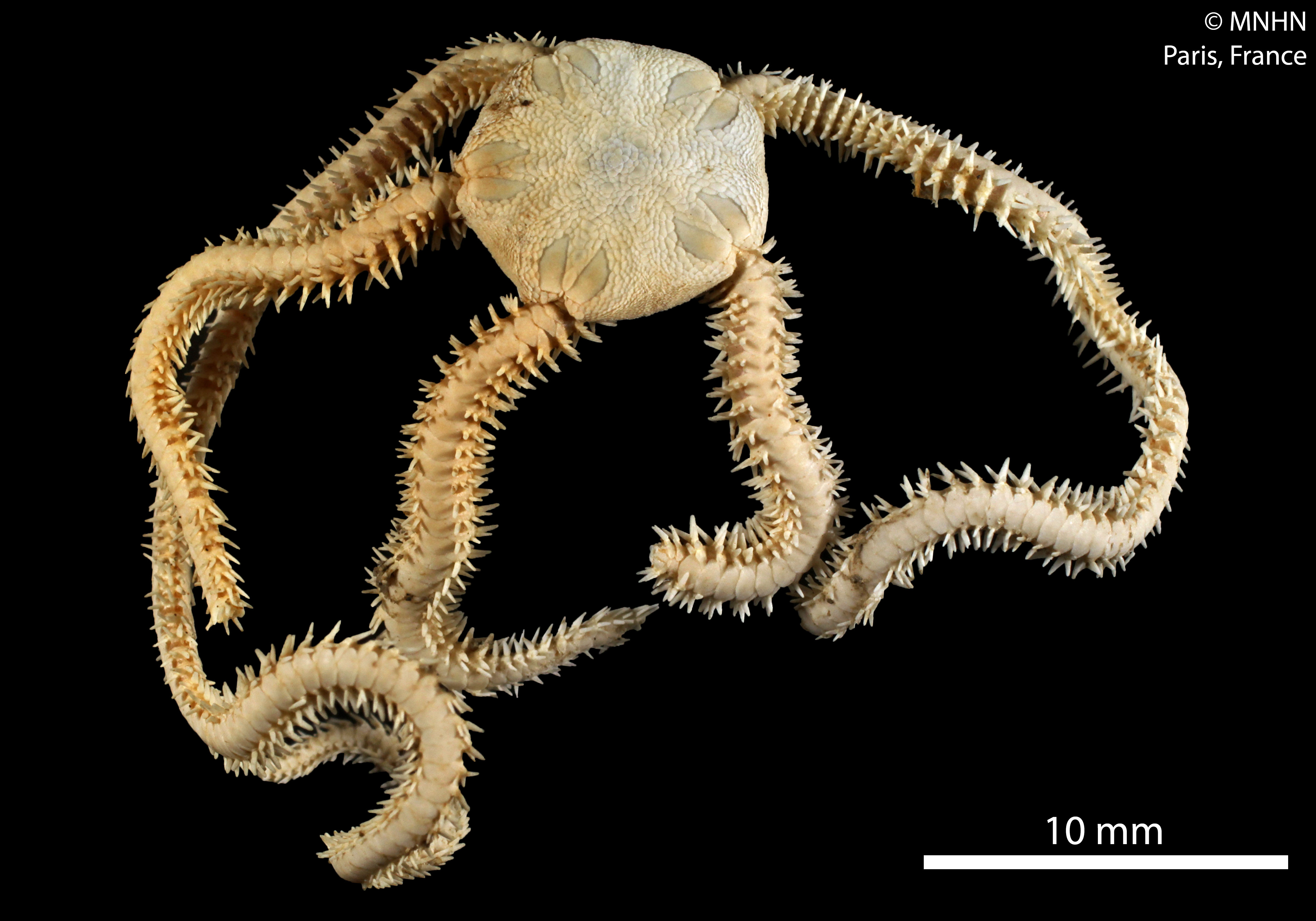

Scientific classification
- Domain: Eukaryota
- Kingdom: Animalia
- Phylum: Echinodermata
- Class: Ophiuroidea
- Order: Ophiurida
- Family: Amphiuridae
- Genus: Amphiura
- Species: A. callida

Binomial name
- Amphiura callida Albuquerque, Campos-Creasey & Guille, 2001

= Amphiura callida =

Species of brittle star

Amphiura callida is a species of brittle star belonging to the family Amphiuridae. It is only known from the continental shelf off the coast of Cabo Frio, southeastern Brazil (depth 50 m).

This is a rather robust brittle star with a disc diameter of up to 10 mm and an arm length of up to 45 mm. It can be distinguished from its congeners from the leaf-like shape of the distal oral papillae and the presence of groups of two to seven spines along the entire length of the arm.
