= Urospora =

Urospora is the genus name of:

- Urospora (alga), a genus of chlorophyte algae in the order Ulotrichales.
- Urospora (alveolate), a genus of apicomplexans in the family Urosporidae.
