= Aseptatorina =

Scientific classification
- Domain: Eukaryota
- Clade: Sar
- Clade: Alveolata
- Phylum: Apicomplexa
- Class: Conoidasida
- Order: Eugregarinorida
- Suborder: Aseptatorina

Families
- Aikinetocystidae; Allantocystidae; Diplocystidae; Enterocystidae; Ganymedidae; Lecudinidae; Monocystidae; Schaudinnellidae; Selenidiidae; Thiriotiidae; Urosporidae

Suborder of single-celled parasites

Aseptatorina is a suborder of parasitic alveolates of the phylum Apicomplexa

== Taxonomy ==
There are eleven families recognised in this suborder. There are ~400 species in these families.

Five families — Allantocystidae, Diplocystidae, Enterocystidae, Ganymedidae and Schaudinnellidae — have only one genus. Aikinetocystidae has two genera.

Two families in this suborder — Ganymedidae and Thiriotiidae — infect crustaceans.

The taxonomy of this suborder may be in need of revision as it has been shown based on SSU 18S rDNA sequences that four families — Ganymedidae from the Aseptatorina and Cephalolobidae, Porosporidae and Uradiophoridae from the Septatorina appear to form a superfamily. The name Cephaloidophoroidea has been proposed for this superfamily

== History ==
This suborder was created by Chakravarty in 1960.

== Description ==
The gamont of the species in this suborder have a single compartment. An epimerite or mucron is found in some species.

Syzygy occurs.
