= Diplocystidae =

Scientific classification
- Domain: Eukaryota
- Clade: Sar
- Superphylum: Alveolata
- Phylum: Apicomplexa
- Class: Conoidasida
- Order: Eugregarinorida
- Suborder: Aseptatorina
- Family: Diplocystidae

Genera
- Diplocystis

Family of single-celled organisms

The Diplocystidae are a family of parasitic alveolates in the phylum Apicomplexa.

== Taxonomy ==
There is one genus in this family - Diplocystis.

The type species of this family and genus is Diplocystis schneideri.

== History ==
This family was created by Bhatia in 1938.

The genus Diplocystis was created by Künstler in 1887.

== Description ==
Species in this family infect insects wherein they infect the gut wall. They are spread by the orofaecal route.

The trophozoites are found in the lumen of the gut and are usually white in colour.

The gametocytes are rounded and may be found either the gut wall or within the host's body.

The sporocysts are spherical or oval and contain eight sporozoites.
