= Pelmatosphaera =

Scientific classification
- Domain: Eukaryota
- Kingdom: Animalia
- Phylum: Orthonectida
- Family: Pelmatosphaeridae; Stunkard, 1937
- Genus: Pelmatosphaera; Caullery & Mesnil, 1904
- Species: P. polycirri

Binomial name
- Pelmatosphaera polycirri Caullery & Mesnil, 1904

Genus of worms

Pelmatosphaera is a monotypic genus of worms belonging to the monotypic family Pelmatosphaeridae. The only species is Pelmatosphaera polycirri.
