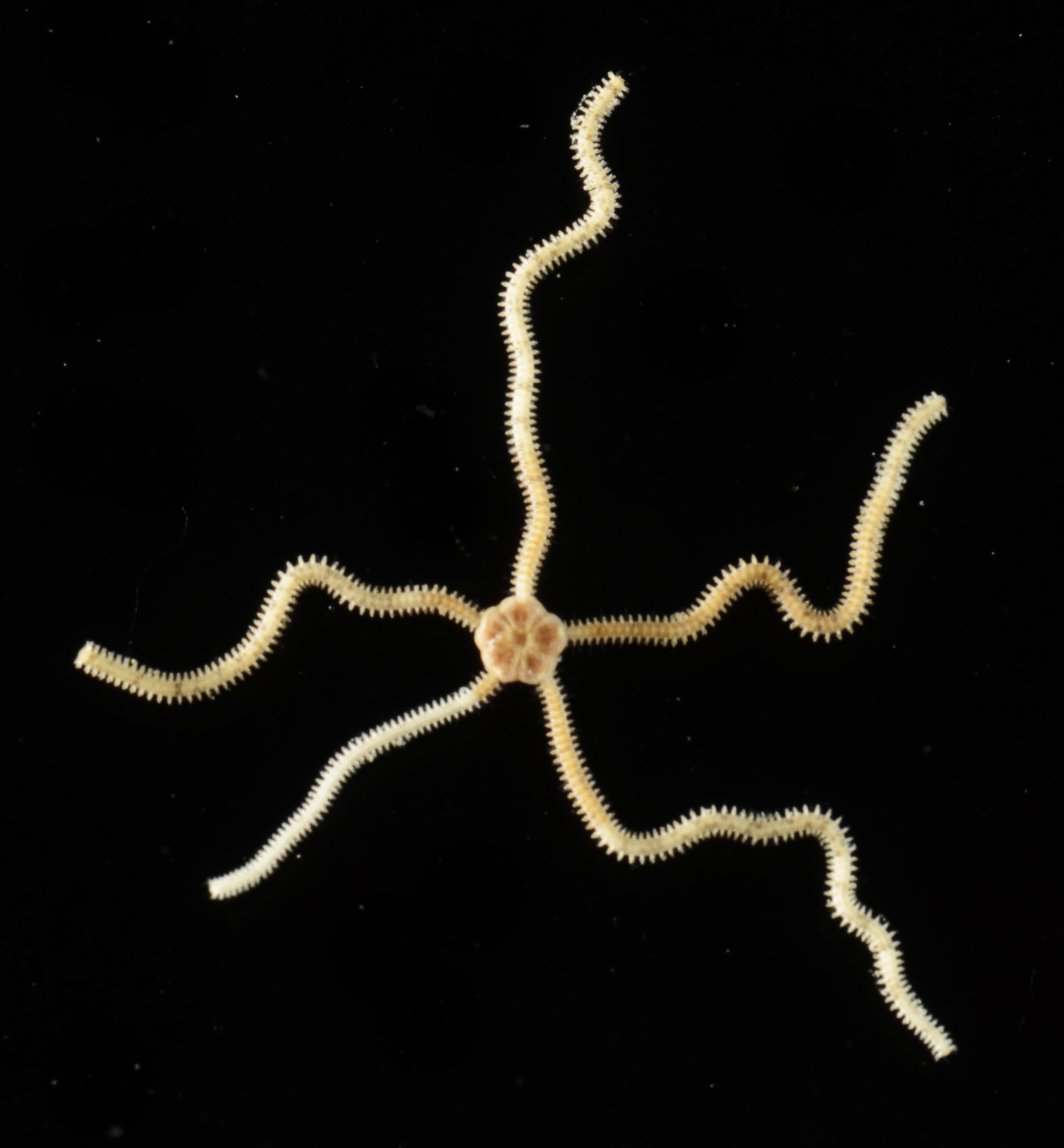

Scientific classification
- Kingdom: Animalia
- Phylum: Echinodermata
- Class: Ophiuroidea
- Order: Ophiurida
- Family: Amphiuridae
- Genus: Amphiodia; Verrill, 1899

Species
- See text

= Amphiodia =

Genus of brittle stars

Amphiodia is a genus of brittle stars belonging to the family Amphiuridae.

== Species ==
- Amphiodia acutispina
- Amphiodia akosmos
- Amphiodia assimilis
- Amphiodia atra
- Amphiodia crassa
- Amphiodia craterodmeta
- Amphiodia cyclaspis
- Amphiodia debita
- Amphiodia digitata
- Amphiodia digitula
- Amphiodia dividua
- Amphiodia euryaspis
- Amphiodia fissa
- Amphiodia frigida
- Amphiodia fuscoalba
- Amphiodia grisea
- Amphiodia guillermosoberoni
- Amphiodia gyraspis
- Amphiodia habilis
- Amphiodia microplax
- Amphiodia minuta
- Amphiodia obtecta
- Amphiodia occidentalis
- Amphiodia oerstedi
- Amphiodia olivacea
- Amphiodia peloria
- Amphiodia periercta
- Amphiodia planispina
- Amphiodia psara
- Amphiodia pulchella
- Amphiodia rhabdota
- Amphiodia rossica
- Amphiodia rugosa
- Amphiodia sculptilis
- Amphiodia serrataspina
- Amphiodia tabogae
- Amphiodia trychna
- Amphiodia tymbara
- Amphiodia urtica
- Amphiodia vicina
- Amphiodia violacea
