= Selenidiidae =

Scientific classification
- Domain: Eukaryota
- Clade: Sar
- Clade: Alveolata
- Phylum: Apicomplexa
- Class: Conoidasida
- Order: Eugregarinorida
- Suborder: Aseptatorina
- Family: Selenidiidae; Brasil, 1907

Genera
- Digyalum; Ditrypanocystis; Heterospora; Selenidium; Selenocystis

Family of single-celled organisms

The Selenidiidae are a family of parasitic alveolates in the phylum Apicomplexa.

== Taxonomy ==
There are five genera in this family.

== History ==
This family was described by Brasil in 1907.
