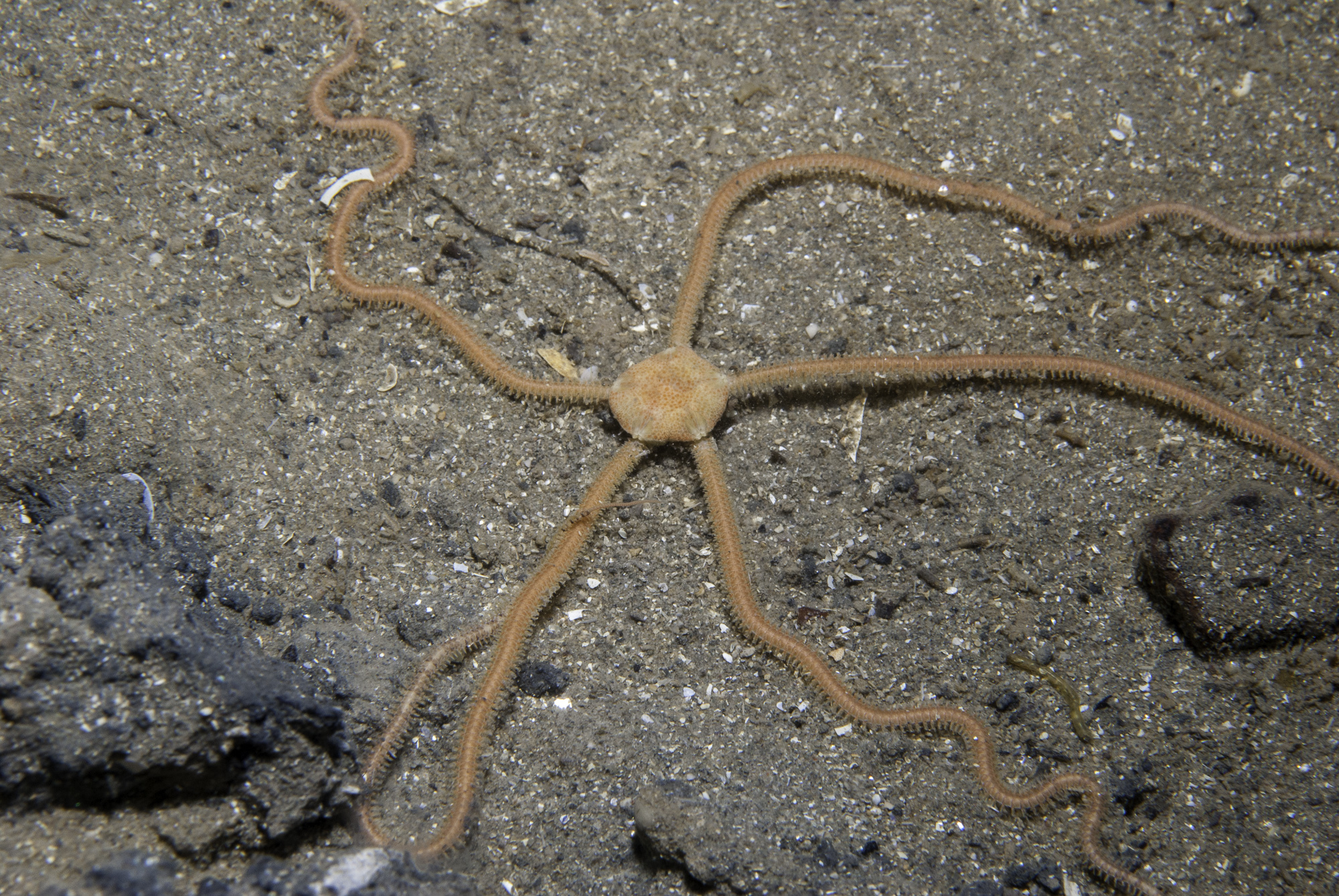

Scientific classification
- Kingdom: Animalia
- Phylum: Echinodermata
- Class: Ophiuroidea
- Order: Amphilepidida
- Family: Amphiuridae
- Genus: Amphiura
- Species: A. filiformis

Binomial name
- Amphiura filiformis (O.F. Müller, 1776)

Synonyms
- Amphiodia ascia Mortensen, 1936; Asterias filiformis O.F. Müller, 1776; Ophiocoma filiformis

= Amphiura filiformis =

Species of brittle star

Amphiura filiformis is a species of brittle star belonging to the family Amphiuridae. It is found on the seabed in the north east Atlantic Ocean and adjoining seas to a depth of 200 metres (660 ft). It digs itself a shallow burrow in the sand and waves its arms in the water above to suspension feed on plankton.

== Description ==
Amphiura filiformis has a central disc up to 10 mm (0.4 in) in diameter and five slender arms up to 100 mm (4 in) long. The aboral (upper) side of the disc is covered in fine scales but there are none on the oral (under side). The general colour of this brittle star is greyish or reddish-brown and it is bioluminescent, emitting a bluish light.

== Distribution and habitat ==
Amphiura filiformis is found in the north east Atlantic Ocean, the North Sea, the Irish Sea, the Mediterranean Sea and the Adriatic Sea at depths between 5 and 200 metres (16 and 656 ft). It lives on sand and muddy-sand bottoms into which it burrows to a depth of about 5 centimetres (2.0 in).

== Biology ==
Amphiura filiformis lives submerged in soft substrate with part of its arms projecting above the surface of the sand for the purpose of suspension feeding and gas exchange. It feeds mostly on zooplankton, but also consumes sediment and detritus when necessary. The arms are also used for removing sediment from the burrow.

Juveniles reach maturity at three to four years of age and it is thought that the lifespan may be twenty years. Spawning takes place between July and September in the Irish Sea but lasts for a longer period in the Mediterranean. Females liberate large numbers of eggs into the sea where they are fertilised. The larvae are planktonic and drift with the current. They can survive for about 88 days before settling on the seabed and undergoing metamorphosis into juveniles. It has been calculated that they can travel about 10 kilometres (6.2 mi) in this time and this allows A. filiformis to expand its range, or recolonise areas where it has suffered mass deaths, as happened in a cold-related event in the German Bight in 1977. Mortality is very high among newly settled juveniles, perhaps because they are unable to bury themselves until they reach a certain size.

== Ecology ==
In the southern North Sea, this species has become much more common during the second half of the 20th century. In the 1930s there was an average of about 69 individuals per square metre in suitable habitats, by 1950 this had dropped to 29 but by 1986, it had increased to 416 per square metre. A similar trend was observed in the Skagerrak and Kattegatt area but not in the Baltic Sea or Irish Sea. It is suggested that this build up in numbers was mainly due to eutrophication of the North Sea, although overfishing of the flatfish that feed on the brittle stars may have played a minor role. An increase in nutrients led to an expansion of plankton and, as suspension feeders, the brittle stars benefited from an increased food supply.

Amphiura filiformis is able to regenerate its arms if they are lost. A study in the North Sea found that only 4% of adults had a full complement of arms and the rest had damaged, missing or regenerating limbs. An examination of the stomach contents of their chief predator, the dab (Limanda limanda) showed that the arms of these brittle stars formed an important part of their diet. The annual consumption of arms by the fish was calculated as about 420 arms per square metre of seabed, the equivalent of 6% of all the A. filiformis arms. Given the speed of regeneration of arms by the brittle stars, it was considered that this did not have a significant effect on the population size.

== Use in research ==
Amphiura filiformis has been used as a model organism for studying stem cells. The researchers were interested in studying how the nervous system recovered during arm regeneration as this could have applications for understanding and treating neurodegenerative diseases in humans.
