= Urospora (alveolate) =

Scientific classification
- Domain: Eukaryota
- Clade: Sar
- Superphylum: Alveolata
- Phylum: Apicomplexa
- Class: Conoidasida
- Order: Eugregarinorida
- Family: Urosporidae
- Genus: Urospora; Schneider, 1895

Synonyms
- Cystobia Mingazzini, 1891 in part Pachysoma Mingazzini, 1891 Syncystis Cuénot, 1891

Genus of intracellular parasites

Urospora is a genus of apicomplexan gregarines.

== Characteristics ==
Urospora is a genus of apicomplexans, protists that behave as intracellular parasites. Species of this genus are monocystid gregarines, found in the body cavity or tissues of their hosts: echinoderms, annelids, nemertines and mollusks. They present lateral or frontal syzygies. Their oocysts are heteropolar, with a thin appendage at one end and a transparent conical funnel at the other end. They reproduce through anisogametes, unequal gametes, liberated through the dehiscence of gametocysts by a simple rupture. The oocysts have a well-differentiated wall known as the 'epispore', 8 sporozoites. Each oocyst has an anterior neck and a marked posterior prolongation.

== Species and hosts ==
Urospora contains the following species, listed next to their host and the tissue they parasitize:

- U. chiridotae (Dogiel 1906 as Cystobia) Goodrich 1925 – blood vessels of sea cucumber Chiridota laevis.
- U. echinocardii Pixell-Goodrich 1915 – coelom of sea urchins Echinocardium and Spatangus.
- U. grassei (Changeux 1961 as Cystobia) Levine 1977 – hemal sinus of sea cucumbers Holothuria tubulosa and H. stellati.
- U. hardyi Goodrich 1950 – coelom of sipunculid worm Sipunculus nudus.
- U. holothuriae (Schneider 1858 as Gregarina) Trégouboff 1918 – blood vessels, coelom and intestine of sea cucumbers Holothuria tubulosa and H. stellati.
- U. intestinalis Bogolepova 1953 – intestine of sea cucumber Cucumaria japonica.
- U. lagidis de St. Joseph 1898 – coelom of polychaete Lagis koreni.
- U. legeri Goodrich 1950 – coelom of sipunculid worm Sipunculus nudus.
- U. longicauda Mingazzini 1891 – unknown location within polychaete Cirratulus filigerus.
- U. longissima (Caullery & Mesnil 1898 as Gonospora) Schrével 1965 – coelom of polychaete Dodecaria caulleryi.
- U. muelleri (Cuénot 1891 as Syncystis) Cuénot 1892 – coelom of sea cucumber Synapta digitata.
- U. nemertis (von Kölliker 1845 as Gregarina) Schneider 1875 – intestine of ribbon worm Nemertes delineatus.
- U. neopolitana Pixell-Goodrich 1915 – coelom of sea urchin Echinocardium cordatum.
- U. ovalis Dogiel 1910 – coelom of sea urchin Echinocardium cordatum and polychaete Travisia forbesii.
- U. pulmonalis Bogolepova 1953 – gills of sea cucumber Cucumaria japonica.
- U. rhyacodrili Gabriel 1929 – seminal vesicles and coelom of oligochaetes Rhyacodrilus coccineus and Tubifex albicola.
- U. schneideri (Mingazzini 1891 as Cystobia) Levine 1977 – blood vessels and coelom of sea cucumbers Holothuria polii, H. impatiens, H. tubulosa and H. stellati.
- U. sipunculi (von Kölliker 1845 as Gregarina) Léger 1892 – coelom of sipunculid worm Sipunculus nudus.
- U. synaptae (Cuénot 1891 as Syncystis) Léger 1892 – coelom of sea cucumbers Synapta digitata, Leptosynapta inhaerens and L. galliennei.
- U. travisiae Dogiel 1910 – coelom of polychaete Travisia forbesi.
- U. tubificis Hesse 1909 – seminal vesicles and coelom of oligochaete Tubifex tubifex.
