= Ganymedidae =

Scientific classification
- Domain: Eukaryota
- Clade: Sar
- Superphylum: Alveolata
- Phylum: Apicomplexa
- Class: Conoidasida
- Order: Eugregarinorida
- Suborder: Aseptatorina
- Family: Ganymedidae; Huxley, 1910

Genera
- Ganymedes

Family of single-celled organisms

The Ganymedidae are a family of parasites in the phylum Apicomplexa.

== Taxonomy ==
There is one genus in this family - Ganymedes.

The type species for this family and genus is Ganymedes anaspidis.

Other species in this genus include Ganymedes oaklandi and Ganymedes themistos.

== History ==
This family was created by Huxley in 1910.

== Description ==
Species in this taxon infect crustaceans.

They are spread by the orofaecal route.

The trophozoites inhabit the gut lumen. They are cylindrical in shape with folds along the surface of the cell. The nucleus is central. The nucleus is off center. A spherical ball like structure may be present at the anterior end of the cell and connected to the body of the cell by a narrow neck. A cup like depression is present at the posterior end.

After undergoing syzygy, the cells have two nuclei.

This new form migrates to the hepatopancreas via its openings into the junction of the fore and midgut.

While within the hepatopancreas, the parasite encysts.

Sporozoites have not been described.
