= Aikinetocystidae =

Scientific classification
- Domain: Eukaryota
- Clade: Sar
- Clade: Alveolata
- Phylum: Apicomplexa
- Class: Conoidasida
- Order: Eugregarinorida
- Suborder: Aseptatorina
- Family: Aikinetocystidae; Bhatia, 1930

Genera
- Aikinetocystis; Nellocystis

Family of single-celled organisms

The Aikinetocystidae are a family of parasitic alveolates in the phylum Apicomplexa. The species in this family infect oligochaetes.

== Taxonomy ==
This family was created in 1930 by Bhatia.

Two genera are recognised in this family - Aikinetocystis and Nellocystis.

== Description ==
The species in this family infect the coelom of oligochaetes. They are spread by the oral-faecal route. The trophozoite is aseptate. The gamont is sac-like and extends at one end into two branches which divide dichotomously, forming eight to 16 secondary branches bearing groups of suckers. The oocysts are biconical (fusiform).
