= Communicating vein =

Type of blood vessel

Details

Identifiers
- Latin: venae communicantes
- FMA: 84601

Communicating veins are veins that communicate two different points of the same venous system. Other veins that connect the superficial venous system with the deep venous system are known as perforator veins.

They can communicate the great saphenous vein with the small saphenous vein, (for example the Giacomini vein).
