= Schaudinnellidae =

Scientific classification
- Domain: Eukaryota
- Clade: Sar
- Superphylum: Alveolata
- Phylum: Apicomplexa
- Class: Conoidasida
- Order: Eugregarinorida
- Suborder: Aseptatorina
- Family: Schaudinnellidae

Genera
- Schaudinnella

Family of single-celled organisms

The Schaudinnellidae are a family of parasitic alveolates in the phylum Apicomplexa.

== Taxonomy ==
There is one genus in this family - Schaudinnella.

The type species in this genus is Schaudinnella henleae.

== History ==
This family was created by Poche in 1913.
