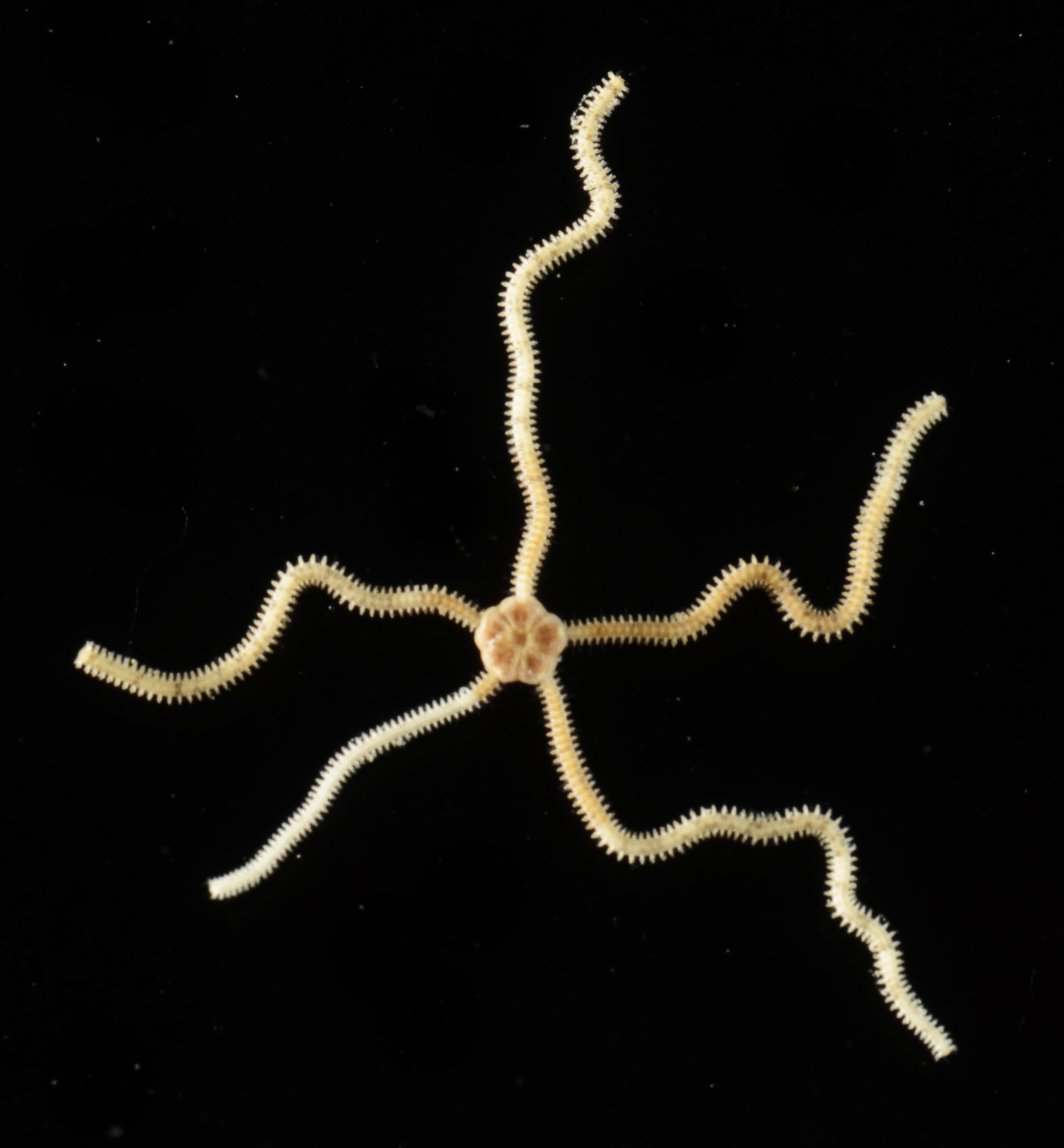

Scientific classification
- Kingdom: Animalia
- Phylum: Echinodermata
- Class: Ophiuroidea
- Order: Amphilepidida
- Family: Amphiuridae
- Genus: Amphiodia
- Species: A. pulchella

Binomial name
- Amphiodia pulchella (Lyman, 1869)

Synonyms
- Amphiodia repens (Lyman, 1875); Amphiura pulchella Lyman, 1869; Amphiura repens Lyman, 1875

= Amphiodia pulchella =

Species of brittle star

Amphiodia pulchella is a species of brittle star belonging to Amphiuridae, a diverse family of the Ophiurida order.

== Description ==
This species has an echinoderm body plan with a central disk and five arms used for locomotion. A. pulchella is composed of a calcium carbonate skeleton and a series of vessels used to move water throughout the body. This species also has tube feet with no suction cups that are used for feeding and sensing the surrounding environment rather than locomotion. Instead, they move by twisting their arms and using nearby objects to propel themselves forward. Amphiodia pulchella are typically a gray or reddish brown color with fine scales covering the central disc. A.pulchella typically burrow their central disc beneath soft sediment. One or two arms will be within the burrow and the remaining arms are exposed. For ventilation, one or two of the arms will undulate within the burrow. A.pulchella will also reinforce their burrows with a layer of mucus to ensure that it can withstand the harsh conditions of a marine environment. Adults reach a maximum central disk size of about 5 mm with arms that are 40-50mm. A. pulchella have proximally separated adoral shields with arm spines. The short medial spine is dorsoventrally flattened and covered in spines. The remaining arm spines are round and blunt. At the apex of the jaw, there are two infradental papillae followed by a single row of square teeth. A unique feature of specimens in the Ophiuroidea class is the ability to regenerate body parts. If an arm is separated from the central disc of a brittle star, the organism can regenerate this limb. This ability is particularly useful in escaping predation. Ophiuroidea are also unique compared to other echinoderms because they have a smaller coelom and a nerve ring in the central disc that is connected to each arm. Furthermore, this species uses the epidermis to sense light and other factors of the surrounding environment as they do not have eyes nor a brain.

== Ecological interactions ==
Brittle stars have little interaction with humans as they are not a prominent part of marine commerce. However, they are a key part of the food chain in reef ecosystems. Brittle stars are prey to a variety of crustaceans and fish. The main source of food for this species is detritus. Although they do not often come in contact with humans they are still affected by human activity. Climate change, which is mostly a result of human activity releasing green house gases into the atmosphere, is causing ocean water to increase in acidity. It was recently reported that the acidic water is increasing the rate of calcification in brittle stars. Brittle stars are producing shells at a greater rate to protect their delicate arms from being compromised by acidic water while they are burrowed. This comes at a great metabolic cost and can paralyze brittle stars within their burrow, often resulting in fatality.

== Reproduction ==
Oocytes 0.65mm in diameter suggest that A.pulchella have a planktonic, feeding larval stage and do not rely on yolk reserves for development. The reproductive organs of this species are small in size and located at the bursal slit. At this slit, respiration is facilitated by circulating water. At the same time, gametes can also be released for reproduction or retained as broods.

== Distribution ==
Amphiodia pulchella typically burrow into sediment at a depth range of 1-71 m and frequent reef environments. Geographically, this species can be found in the Western Central Atlantic including the coasts of Florida, Mexico, Cuba, Jamaica, Puerto Rico, Tobago, Belize, Brazil, and Argentina. Amphiodia pulchella thrive under mesohaline conditions with DO ≥2.0 ml L-1.
