= Enterocystidae =

Scientific classification
- Domain: Eukaryota
- Clade: Sar
- Superphylum: Alveolata
- Phylum: Apicomplexa
- Class: Conoidasida
- Order: Eugregarinorida
- Suborder: Aseptatorina
- Family: Enterocystidae

Genera
- Enterocystis

Family of single-celled organisms

The Enterocystidae are a family of parasites in the phylum Apicomplexa.

== Taxonomy ==
There is one genus in this family - Enterocystis

== History ==
This family was created by Codreanu in 1940.

== Description ==
These organisms have a spherical nucleus and can have a deep brown cytoplasm. They are found in the gut of insect hosts; such hosts include Psocoptera, and Ephemeroptera
