= Thiriotiidae =

Scientific classification
- Domain: Eukaryota
- Clade: Sar
- Superphylum: Alveolata
- Phylum: Apicomplexa
- Class: Conoidasida
- Order: Eugregarinorida
- Suborder: Aseptatorina
- Family: Thiriotiidae

Genera
- Thiriotia

Family of single-celled organisms

The Thiriotiidae are a family of parasitic alveolates in the phylum Apicomplexa.

== Taxonomy ==
There is one genus in this family - Thiriotia.

The type species is Thiriotia pisae.

Other species in this genus include Thiriotia pugettiae.

== History ==
This genus was created by Desportes, Vivarès and Théodoridès in 1977.
