= Urosporidae =

Scientific classification
- Domain: Eukaryota
- Clade: Sar
- Clade: Alveolata
- Phylum: Apicomplexa
- Class: Conoidasida
- Order: Eugregarinorida
- Suborder: Aseptatorina
- Superfamily: Lecudinoidea
- Family: Urosporidae; Léger, 1892

Genera
- Ceratospora; Gonospora; Lithocystis; Paragonospora; Pterospora; Urospora

Family of single-celled organisms

The Urosporidae are a family of parasitic alveolates in the phylum Apicomplexa.

== Taxonomy ==
There is six genera in this family.

== History ==
This family was described by Léger in 1892.

== Description ==
There are 45 recognised species in this family.
