= Giacomini vein =

Vein of the lower limb

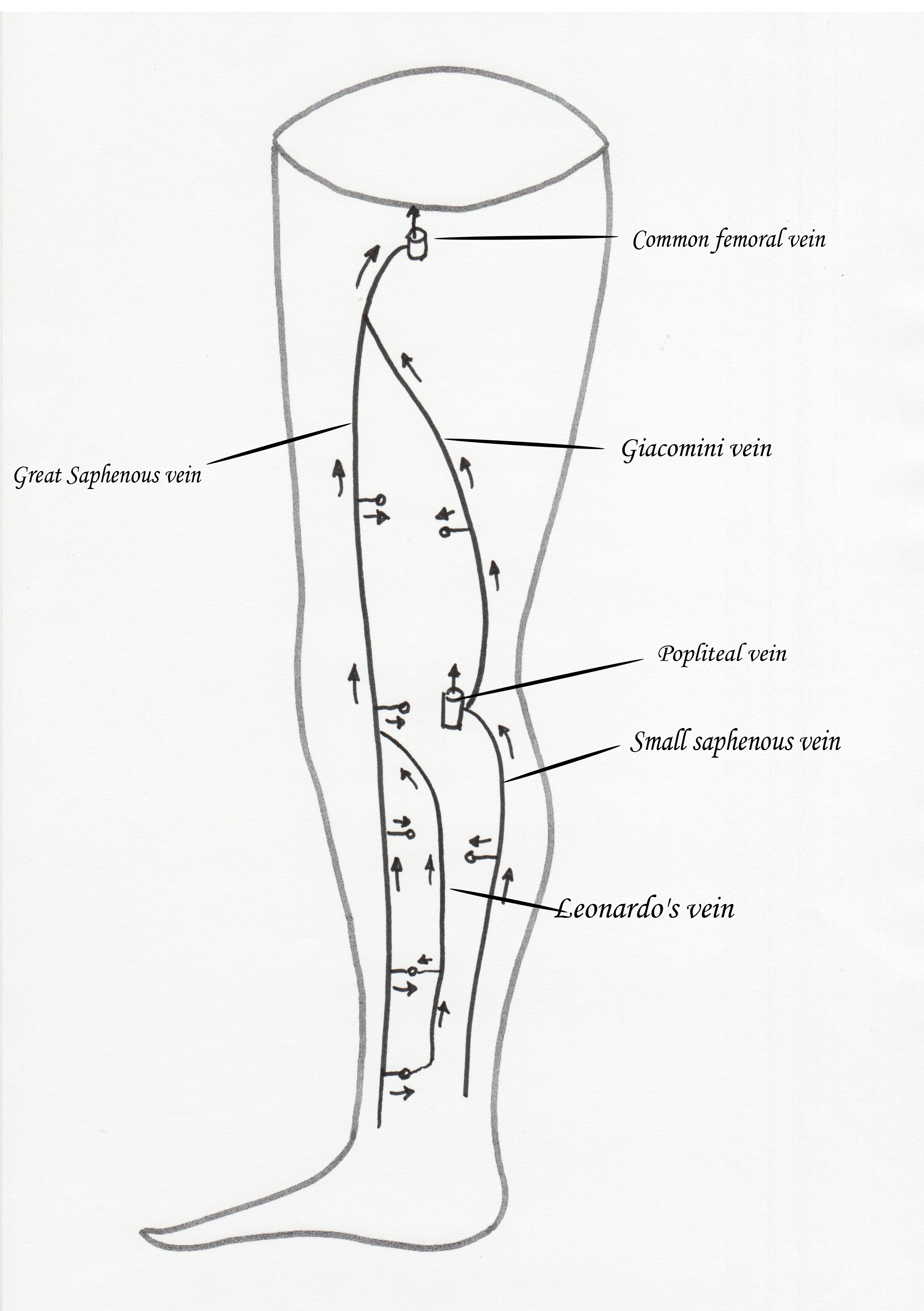
- Giacomini vein

Details
- Drains to: great saphenous vein

Identifiers
- Latin: extensio cranialis venae saphenae parvae

The Giacomini vein or cranial extension of the small saphenous vein is a communicating vein between the great saphenous vein (GSV) and the small saphenous vein (SSV). It is named after the Italian anatomist Carlo Giacomini (1840–1898). The Giacomini vein courses the posterior thigh as either a trunk projection, or tributary of the SSV. In one study it was found in over two-thirds of limbs. Another study in India found the vein to be present in 92% of those examined. It is located under the superficial fascia and its insufficiency seemed of little importance in the majority of patients with varicose disease, but the use of ultrasonography has highlighted a new significance of this vein. It can be part of a draining variant of the SSV which continues on to reach the GSV at the proximal third of the thigh instead of draining into the popliteal vein. The direction of its flow is usually anterograde (the physiological direction) but it can be retrograde when this vein acts as a bypass from an insufficient GSV to SSV to call on this last one to collaborate in draining. Many discussions exist about this vein, some of them confusing to a non-expert reader. Insufficiency in the Giacomini vein can present in isolation but is mostly seen together with a GSV insufficiency. It has been shown to be effectively treated either with endovenous laser ablation or by ultrasound guided sclerotherapy.

== See also ==
- Lower limbs venous ultrasonography
