= Ciliocincta =

Scientific classification
- Domain: Eukaryota
- Kingdom: Animalia
- Phylum: Orthonectida
- Family: Rhopaluridae
- Genus: Ciliocincta; Kozloff, 1965

Genus of marine invertebrates

Ciliocincta is a genus of worms belonging to the family Rhopaluridae.

Species:

- Ciliocincta akkeshiensis Tajika, 1979
- Ciliocincta julini (Caullery & Mesnil, 1899)
- Ciliocincta sabellariae Kozloff, 1965
