= Amphipholis squamata =

Scientific classification
- Kingdom: Animalia
- Phylum: Echinodermata
- Class: Ophiuroidea
- Order: Amphilepidida
- Family: Amphiuridae
- Genus: Amphipholis
- Species: A. squamata

Binomial name
- Amphipholis squamata Delle Chiaje, 1829

Species of brittle star

Amphipholis squamata, common names brooding snake star and dwarf brittle star, is a species complex of brittle stars in the family Amphiuridae.

== Description ==
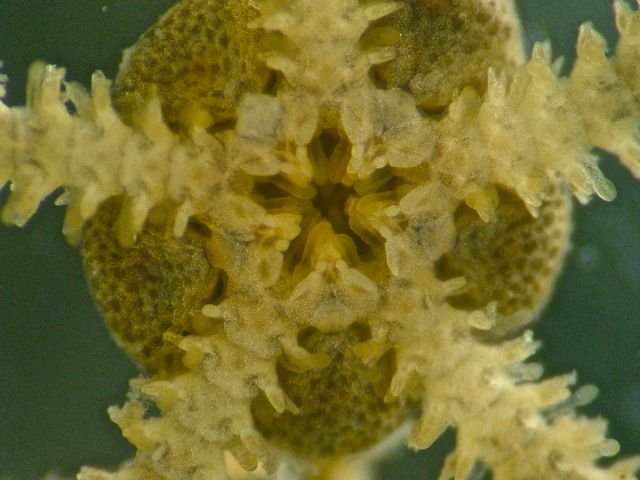
Oral view of disc

This species is small, grey to bluish-white, and phosphorescent. Brooding individuals emit more light than non-brooding individuals. It has thin, short arms around 20 mm long. The round disc is 3 to 5mm, and has a scale covering with D-shaped radial plates. It has rhombic-shaped mouth shields and extremely wide mouth papillae.

== Distribution ==
Amphipholis squamata is found in all parts of the British Isles and also in Ireland. It has been recorded in many other parts of the world, including France,New Zealand and other places, with one conference paper referring to it as a cosmopolitan species. Molecular studies have shown that there are multiple species in this complex.

== Habitat ==
This brittle star lives in the intertidal zone in shallow water, and can be found under large stones, shells, and around sessile invertebrates such as bryozoans.

== Parasites ==
This brittle star hosts at least two species of ectoparasites. The following two that have been confirmed are both copepods:

- Cancerilla tubulata Dalyell, 1851
- Parachordeumium amphiurae (Hérouard, 1906)

== Synonyms ==
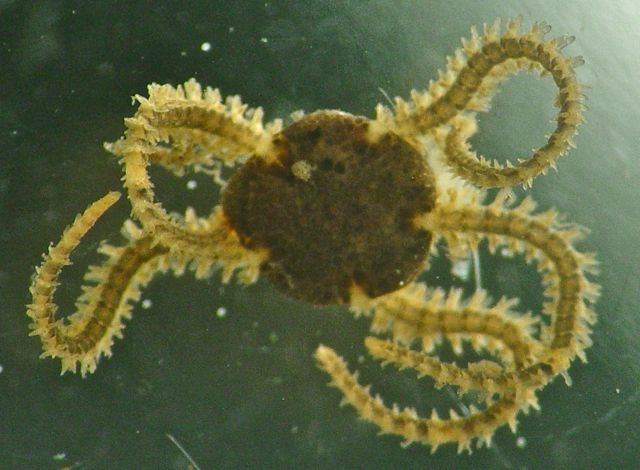
Amphipholis squamata found on Great Cumbrae, Scotland

- Asterias noctiluca Viviani, 1805
- Ophiura elegans Leach, 1815 [suppressed]
  - Amphiura elegans (Leach, 1815)
- Asterias squamata Delle Chiaje, 1828
  - Amphioplus squamata (Delle Chiaje, 1828)
  - Amphiura squamata (Delle Chiaje, 1828)
  - Axiognathus squamata (Delle Chiaje, 1828)
- Amphiura neglecta Forbes, 1843
- Ophiolepis tenuis Ayres, 1854
- Amphiura tenera Lütken, 1856
  - Amphipholis tenera (Lütken, 1856)
- Amphiura tenuispina Ljungman, 1865
  - Amphipholis tenuispina (Ljungman, 1865)
  - Amphipholis squamata tenuispina (Ljungman, 1865)
- Amphipholis appressa Ljungman, 1872
- Amphipholis kinbergi Ljungman, 1872
- Amphipholis lineata Ljungman, 1872
- Amphipholis patagonica Ljungman, 1872
- Amphiura parva Hutton, 1878
- Amphipholis australiana H.L. Clark, 1909
- Ophiactis minor Döderlein, 1910
  - Amphipholis minor (Döderlein, 1910)
- Amphipholis japonica Matsumoto, 1915
- Amphipholis tissieri Reys, 1961
