= Intoshia =

Scientific classification
- Domain: Eukaryota
- Kingdom: Animalia
- Phylum: Orthonectida
- Family: Rhopaluridae
- Genus: Intoshia; Giard, 1877

Genus of orthonectids

Intoshia is a genus of worms belonging to the family Rhopaluridae.

Species:

- Intoshia leptoplanae Giard, 1877
- Intoshia linei Giard, 1877
- Intoshia major Shtein, 1953
- Intoshia metchnikovi (Caullery & Mesnil, 1899)
- Intoshia paraphanostomae (Westblad, 1942)
- Intoshia variabili (Alexandrov & Sljusarev, 1992)
