= Carlo Giacomini =

Italian anatomist and neuroscientist (1840 - 1898)

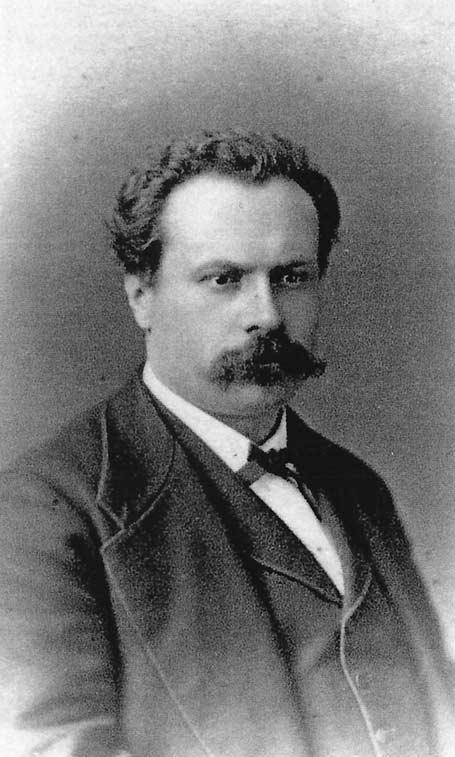
Carlo Giacomini

Carlo Giacomini (29 November 1840 – 5 July 1898) was an Italian anatomist, neuroscientist. He was a professor at the University of Turin and also made significant contributions in anthropology and embryology. He worked with the physiologist, Angelo Mosso (1846-1910), which led to the first recording of human brain pulsations. Giacomini vein, a lower limb vein, and the band of Giacomini, a band of uncus gyri parahippocampalis he discovered in 1882, and the Giacomini vertebrae are named after him.

He contributed anthropological research regarding differences among human races, and also took an interest in teratology linked to the various cases.

== Early life ==
He was born on 29 November 1840 in Sale. He graduated in medicine and surgery in 1864 at the University of Turin. In 1866, he was a volunteer doctor in the Third Italian War of Independence and later in the Franco-Prussian War in 1870. In 1868, he became anatomical area at the Institute of the same university. In 1874, he succeeded Prof. Giovanni De Lorenzi as professor of anatomy after Lorenzi's death. In 1880, he became a full professor.

== Career ==
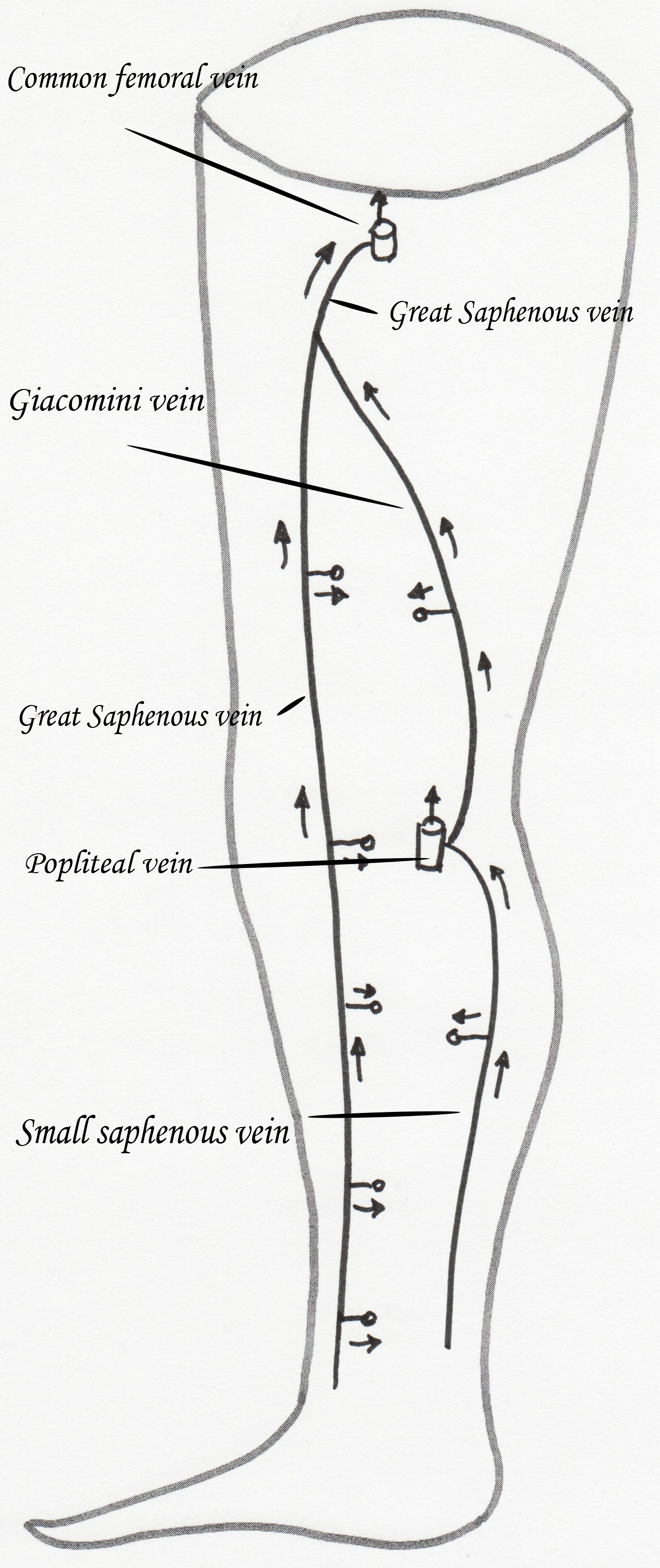
Giacomini vein

At the beginning of his scientific career, he conducted clinical trials with the physiologist Angelo Mosso that led to the first recording of human brain pulsations. His early research includes studies on nerve abnormalities of the hand and the venous circulation of the lower limbs and the blood of the upper limbs. The so-called vertebrae Giacomini (from the fifth to the eighth thoracic vertebra) are a dorsal limit of the heart. Since 1882, followed an in-depth study of brain morphology: describing the limbic lobe, a part of the hippocampal gyrus door today known as the name of band of Giacomini; deduced a complete work on the cerebral convolutions (1882).

He conducted anthropological studies correlating the various convolutions of the brain to different races, demonstrating the great variety of brains. This research contrasted the beliefs of the anthropologist-criminologist Cesare Lombroso, who hypothesized that criminal activity is associated with atavistic morphology in the brain. He published a book on his studies of the brains of three patients with microencephaly in 1885. In 1886, he first described an abnormality of the cranio-vertebral, called Os Odontoideum, and realized that this anomaly could alter the motility of the passage cranio-spinal, anticipating the concept of spinal instability. In 1871, he was elected a member of the Royal Academy of Medicine. In 1876, he became the director of the Cabinet of Museum of Human Anatomy Luigi Rolando of Turin and in 1887, he became a member of the Academy of Sciences of the same city.

== Post-mortem ==
Giacomini died on 5 July 1898 in Turin. He wrote in his will that he wanted his skeleton and brain to be preserved after his death. He died of a stroke at the age of 58 and the preservation was performed two days after his death. His skeleton was exhibited along with his brain at the Museum of Human Anatomy Luigi Rolando of Torino. The brain at the feet of the skeleton was prepared with a conservative technique he had developed, which used a combination of chloride of zinc, alcohol, and glycerine. Giacomini presented his technique to the Royal Academy of Medicine of Turin on 7 June 1879. Sperino, who preserved his brain, found that his brain had a band of Giacomini.

== Selected works ==
- Anomalies of Development of the Human Embryo
- Guide to the Study of the Cerebral Convolutions
- Anatomy of the Negro
- Brains of Microcephalics
