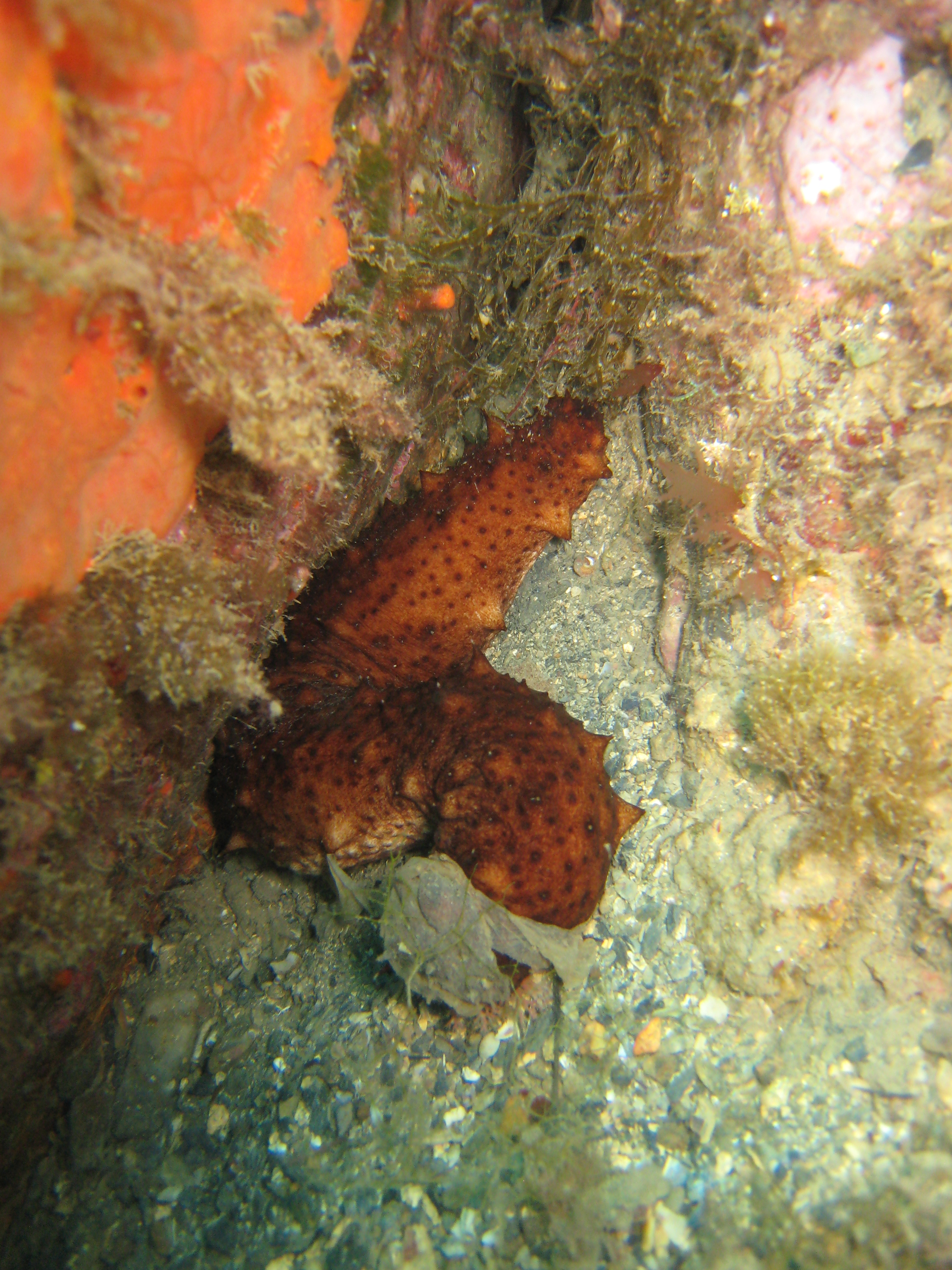

Conservation status
- Data Deficient (IUCN 3.1)

Scientific classification
- Kingdom: Animalia
- Phylum: Echinodermata
- Class: Holothuroidea
- Order: Holothuriida
- Family: Holothuriidae
- Genus: Holothuria
- Species: H. stellati

Binomial name
- Holothuria stellati Delle Chiaje, 1824

Synonyms
- Sporadipus glaber Grube, 1840

= Holothuria stellati =

Species of sea cucumber

Holothuria stellati, also known as the Brown sea cucumber, is a species of sea cucumber in the family Holothuriidae. First described by Delle Chiaje in 1824. There are two accepted subspecies, Holothuria stellati dakarensis and Holothuria stellati mammata, though there is still debate on whether or not they are separate species.

== Description ==
Holothuria stellati grows up to 12.9 cm, rarely reaching 20 cm. Their body is a light to dark brown color with a few darker spots, and cylindrical in shape. Their bodies are hard on the outside, due to their calcareous endoskeleton. Their dorsal side forms a round bivium, with 2 rows of large, pointed papillae, and their ventral side forms a flat trivium, with 3 rows of podia with ossicles. They use these podia for locomotion as well as feeding, by pushing sand into their mouths (11). Holothuria stellati has smaller ossicles than other species within its genus, with the tables ranging from 31 to 52 μm in diameter, spires from 21 to 42 μm tall, and buttons 31 to 42 μm long. The mouth and anus are located on opposite terminal ends of the body.

== Distribution ==
H. stellati lives on both soft and rocky sandy substrates in tropical climates. They reside exclusively in the neritic zones of the benthos of the Mediterranean Sea and Adriatic Sea, near Western Italy, Monaco, Tunisia, Turkey, and Algeria (2). There have been reports of H. stellati appearing in the Canary Islands and Croatia, but it has yet to be confirmed.

== Life cycle ==
H. stellati are separated into male and female sexes. Like most sea cucumbers, the females release the eggs into the water to be fertilized by a nearby male. Fertilization occurs externally. Before becoming full sea cucumbers, H. stellati goes through 2 larval stages. The first stage is auricularia, in which H. stellati is a planktonic larva. In the second stage, they become barrel shaped, transforming into doliolaria. Though several species of sea cucumbers are known to be able to fissure and reproduce asexually, there has been no documented research showing H. stellati has the ability to do so.

== Diet ==
Not much is known about the exact diet of H. Stellati. They are found to be omnivores, feeding on plankton, algae, and nearby floating detritus. Like other species of sea cucumbers, they perform both suspension feeding and deposit feeding, sifting large amounts of sediment or water through their mouths and secreting out of their anus.

== Parasites ==
H. stellati are hosts and prey to multiple species of copepod parasites, including Alantogynous dellamarei, Calpysina changeuxi, and Tisbe holothuriae.

== Conservation ==
H. stellati is a not very well studied species, with very limited information on its population and distribution. However, it is an increasing target of fisheries, more specifically in Algeria and Turkey. Additionally, in a study done in 2009 by Graham and Thompson, it was found that sea cucumbers selectively ingest fragments of plastic they come across in the sediment, which may be dangerous to these benthic organisms. These issues make conservation efforts and more studies all the more important, as they may be overfished or having their habitats harmed.
