= Rhopaluridae =

Scientific classification
- Domain: Eukaryota
- Kingdom: Animalia
- Phylum: Orthonectida
- Family: Rhopaluridae

Family of marine invertebrates

Rhopaluridae is a family of worms belonging to the phylum Orthonectida, order and class unknown.

Genera:

- Ciliocincta Kozloff, 1965
- Intoshia Giard, 1877
- Prothelminthus Jourdain, 1880
- Rhopalura Giard, 1877
- Stoecharthrum Caullery & Mesnil, 1899
