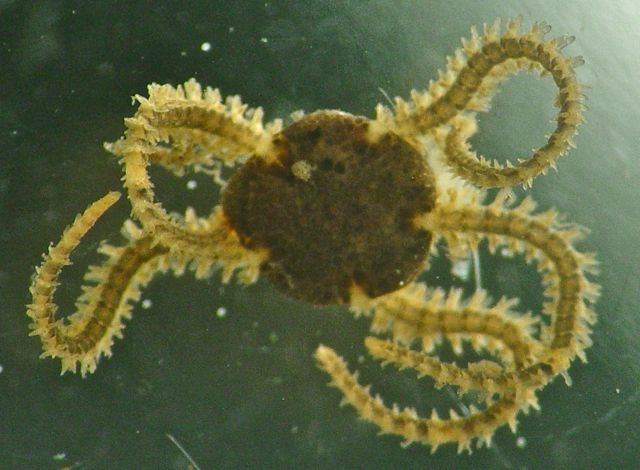
- Image of Amphipholis squamata

Scientific classification
- Kingdom: Animalia
- Phylum: Echinodermata
- Class: Ophiuroidea
- Order: Ophiurida
- Family: Amphiuridae
- Genus: Amphipholis; Thomas, 1966

Species
- See text

= Amphipholis =

Genus of echinoderms

Amphipholis is a large genus of brittle stars (Ophiuroidea) found in oceans worldwide from tropics to Arctic and Antarctic regions. Some species have been used to study echinoderm development (Amphipholis kochii) and bioluminescence (the dwarf brittle star, Amphipholis squamata).

== Systematics ==
Amphipholis is a large genus with potentially many cryptic species. The high variability may be due to common parthenogenetic reproduction. The type species of the genus is Amphipholis januarii Ljungman, 1866(=Amphipholis gracillima (Stimpson, 1852)).

Species include:

- Amphipholis abdita
- Amphipholis andreae
- Amphipholis bananensis
- Amphipholis clypeata
- Amphipholis elevata
- Amphipholis erecta
- Amphipholis geminata
- Amphipholis goesi
- Amphipholis gracillima
- Amphipholis granulata
- Amphipholis kochii
- Amphipholis laevidisca
- Amphipholis limbata
- Amphipholis linopneusti
- Amphipholis litoralis
- Amphipholis loripes
- Amphipholis microdiscus
- Amphipholis misera
- Amphipholis murmanica
- Amphipholis nudipora
- Amphipholis pentacantha
- Amphipholis platydisca
- Amphipholis procidens
- Amphipholis pugetana
- Amphipholis puntarenae
- Amphipholis sigillata
- Amphipholis similis
- Amphipholis sobrina
- Amphipholis squamata
- Amphipholis strata
- Amphipholis tetracantha
- Amphipholis torelli
- Amphipholis vitax
