= Allantocystis =

Scientific classification
- Domain: Eukaryota
- Clade: Sar
- Clade: Alveolata
- Phylum: Apicomplexa
- Class: Conoidasida
- Order: Eugregarinorida
- Family: Allantocystidae
- Genus: Allantocystis
- Species: A. dasyhelei

Binomial name
- Allantocystis dasyhelei Keilin, 1920

Genus of single-celled organisms

Allantocystis is a genus in the family Allantocystidae. Its only species is Allantocystis dasyhelei, a gregarine parasite of the larval biting midge Dasyhelea obscura.

== Description ==
A. dasyhelei are found in the midgut of the host larva as 70 μm by 20 μm forms, running parallel to the host body. They are unique from other Gregarine parasites in that their cysts are elongated, rather than spherical.

== Taxonomy ==
A. dasyhelei is the only species in the genus Allantocystis. Allantocystis is the only genus in the family Allantocistidae.

== History ==
A. dasyhelei was described by David Keilin in 1920 from larval biting midges he found in the decomposing sap of infected Elm and Horse-chestnut trees in Cambridge.
