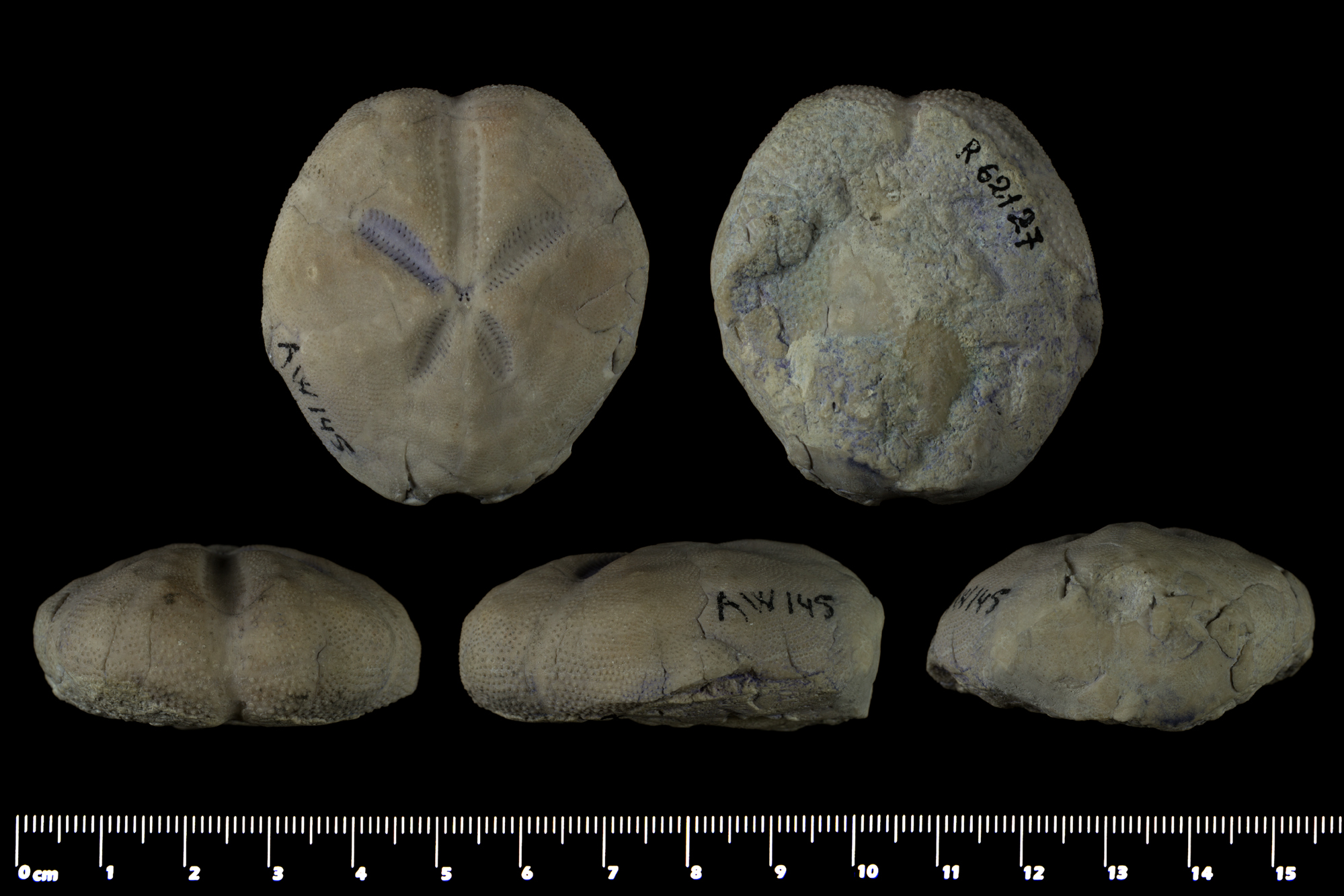
- Brissopsis lyrifera fossil

Scientific classification
- Kingdom: Animalia
- Phylum: Echinodermata
- Class: Echinoidea
- Order: Spatangoida
- Family: Brissidae
- Genus: Brissopsis
- Species: B. lyrifera

Binomial name
- Brissopsis lyrifera (Forbes, 1841)

= Brissopsis lyrifera =

Species of sea urchin

Brissopsis lyrifera is a species of sea urchins of the family Brissidae. Their armour is covered with spines. It was first described by the British naturalist Edward Forbes in 1841. This species of sea urchin is a nonselective, infaunal deposit feeder.
