= Sand star =

Sand star is a common name for several starfish (sea stars) and may refer to:

- Astropecten, a genus containing species known as sand stars
- Luidia, a genus containing species known as sand stars
