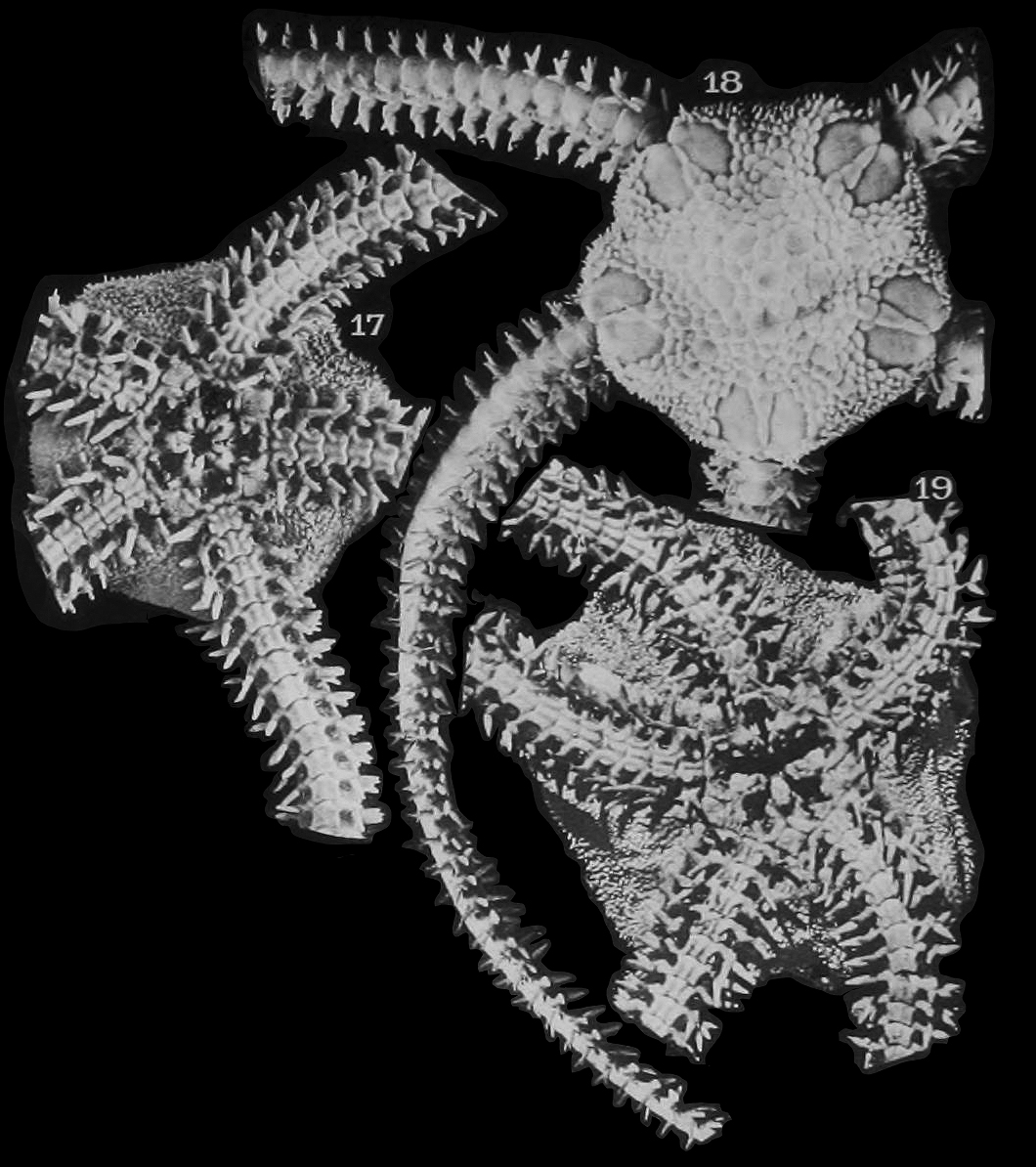
- Acrocnida semisquamata - Planche VIII

Scientific classification
- Kingdom: Animalia
- Phylum: Echinodermata
- Class: Ophiuroidea
- Order: Amphilepidida
- Family: Amphiuridae
- Genus: Acrocnida; Gislén, 1926

= Acrocnida =

Genus of echinoderms

Acrocnida is a genus of brittle stars in the family Amphiuridae. The genus contains three members: Acrocnida brachiata, Acrocnida semisquamata, and Acrocnida spatulispina. There has also been observed hybridization between both Acrocnida brachiata and Acrocnida spatulispina. It is a fairly common genus, usually found along the coasts of Northwestern Europe, but with some species like semisquamata appearing around West Africa. Members of this genus primarily prefer intertidal and subtidal habitats, and they are less likely to be found in intertidal areas by comparison. This genus was not officially classified until 1926, by T. Gislén. One study found that the increased calcification that is caused by Acrocnida brachiata could be a potential source of carbon dioxide for not only the warm, shallow environments they live in, but also for the atmosphere.

== Species ==
The World Register of Marine Species lists the following species.

- Acrocnida brachiata (Montagu, 1804)
- Acrocnida semisquamata (Koehler, 1914)
- Acrocnida spatulispina (Stöhr & Muths, 2010)

The species, Acrocnida brachiata, was recently found to be two species, Acrocnida brachiata and Acrocnida semisquamata, by Stöhr & Muths in 2010.

== Distribution ==
This genus can be found spread around Northwestern Europe and off the Western coast of Africa. Acrocnida members generally prefer the sandy bottoms (specifically fine or muddy sand) of shallow coastal zones for their habitats. Acrocnida brachiata is a fairly widespread member of this genus in terms of distribution. While it was discovered in 1808 by George Montagu, their spread was still being recorded as far as the 1970s, with it being found in the North Sea. Recently, Acrocnida brachiata has been found in the Aegean Sea for the first time in 2007 after only being noted on the Mediterranean Sea facing coast of Turkey in 1995. Acrocnida semisquamata is primarily located off the coast of Ghana, and Acrocnida spatulispina has only been observed in the English Channel.

== Morphology ==
Acrocnida follows the body plan of other Amphiuridae, as they possess central disks surrounded by five long, thin arms. They only possess one outer mouth papilla, which is removed from the infradental papillae. Members of Acrocnida possess mucous glands described as "multecellular aggregations of pyriform cells with elongate necks." Like other members of Ophiurida, Acrocnida can part with limbs and regenerate a new limb.

== Reproductive cycle ==
These sea stars mainly follow an annual schedule for their reproductive cycle. Looking at Acrocnida brachiata, gonads begin forming in late Summer and Autumn, with the spawning taking place within a range of March to May. This places Acrocnida brachiata and other members of the genus in the category of "discreet annual breeder." Eggs created by Acrocnida brachiata lie in a range of 180 to 350 micrometers. This size places Acrocnida with an "intermediate level of fecundity" and a larval development similar to other genera of sea stars.

== Common behavior ==
Acrocnida and other Amphiuridae practice very similar behaviors. In order to avoid predation, these organisms dig a semi-permanent hole, which they reinforce using the mucus they naturally produce. They then dip their disk into the hole, and leave the arms just poking out enough so that they may still explore and interact with the area outside their burrow. Members of the genus Acrocnida utilize their Water vascular system to ventilate their burrows. Acrocnida brachiata is usually seen with Echinocardium cordatum, commonly known as the Sea Potato.
