= Lecudinidae =

Scientific classification
- Domain: Eukaryota
- Clade: Sar
- Superphylum: Alveolata
- Phylum: Apicomplexa
- Class: Conoidasida
- Order: Eugregarinorida
- Suborder: Aseptatorina
- Genus: Lecudinidae; Kamm, 1922

Genera
- Anchorina; Ancora; Ascocystis; Ascogregarina; Bhatiella; Chlamydocystis; Cochleomeritus; Conorhynchus; Contortiocorpa; Cotyloepimeritus; Cygnicollum; Cytomorpha; Difficilina; Diplauxis; Ditrypanocystis; Doliocystis; Extremocystis; Ferraria; Hentschelia; Hyperidion; Koellikerella; Koellikeria; Lankesteria; Lateroprotomeritus; Lecudina; Lecythion; Monocystella; Ophioidina; Paraophioidina; Pleurozyga; Polyrhabdina; Pontesia; Psychodiella; Selenocystis; Sphinctocystis; Sycia; Trichotokara; Ulivina; Viviera; Zygosoma

Family of single-celled organisms

Lecudinidae is a family of parasitic alveolates of the phylum Apicomplexa.

== Taxonomy ==
There are about 35 genera in this family.

== History ==
The family was described by Kamm in 1922. It was raised to superfamily status by Levine in 1971.

== Description ==
The gamont has a truncated anterior mucron.

The spherical to ovoid nucleus is located in anterior third of the body. It has a central nucleolus.

Syzygy is lateral and often involves multiple associations.

These organisms move by gliding.
