= Museum of Human Anatomy Luigi Rolando =

Museum in Turin, Italy

Coordinates: 45.0495°N 7.6804°E

Museum of Human Anatomy Luigi Ronaldo
- Museo di anatomia umana Luigi Rolando
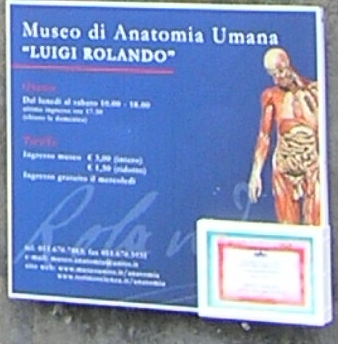

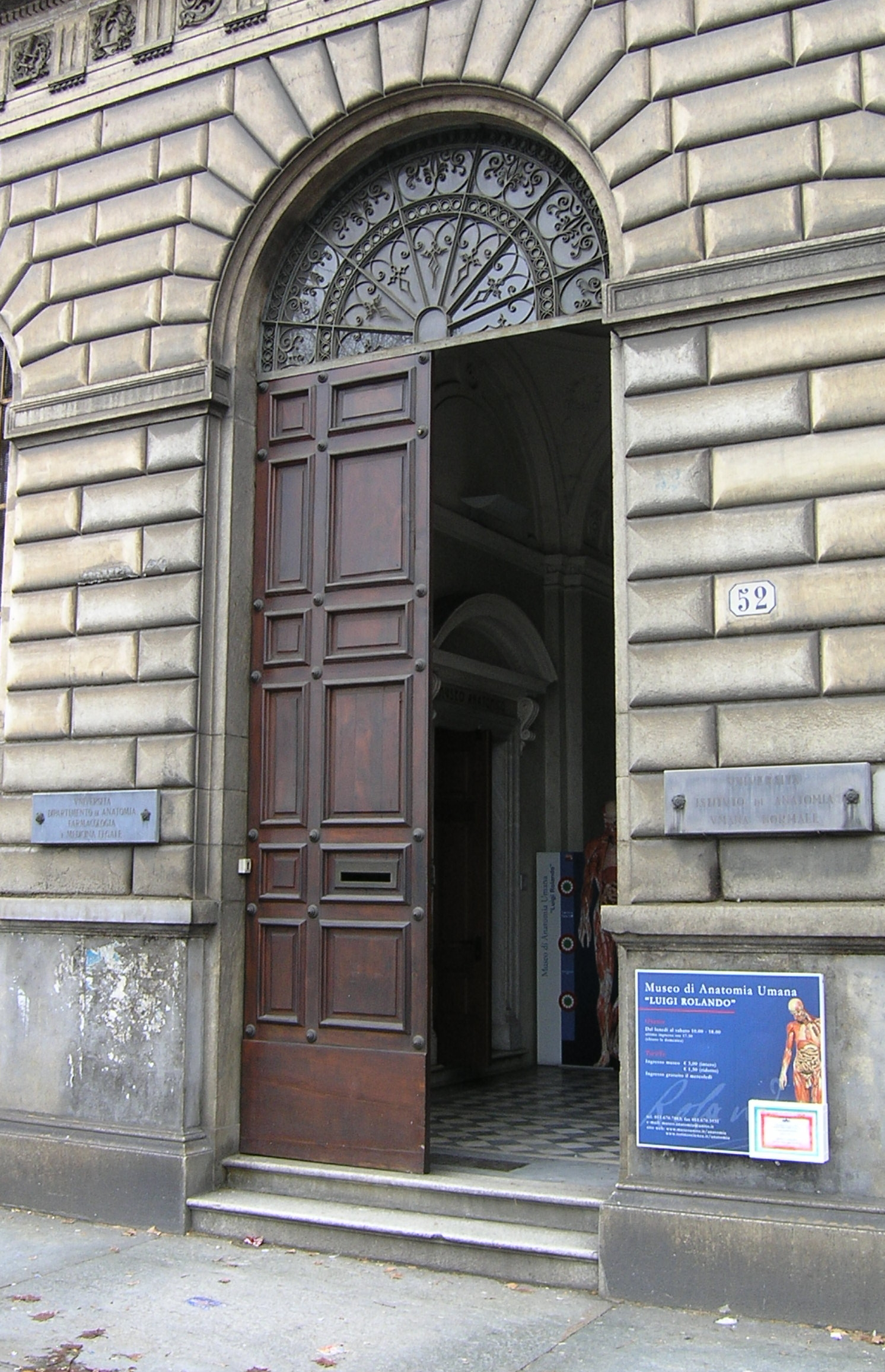
- Established: 1739
- Location: Palazzo degli Istituti Anatomici, Corso Massimo d'Azeglio 52, Torino, Italy
- Type: Museum of Anatomy
- Website: museounito.it/anatomia/

The Museum of Human Anatomy Luigi Rolando (Italian: Museo di anatomia umana Luigi Rolando) is a museum of human anatomy that was founded in 1739 with headquarters in Turin, Italy. It is part of the museum network of the University of Turin and moved to its current location in the Building of the Anatomical Institutes (Italian: Palazzo degli Istituti Anatomici) in 1898.

== History ==
The study of anatomy in Turin began in 1563, with the arrival in town of Savona scholar Angelo Visca, but it was only in 1739 that it was the first collection of anatomical preparations, commissioned by Giovanni Battista Bianchi Carlo Emanuele III for forming the University Museum. Of that collection remain a valuable statue in plaster of a pregnant woman, a decomposable model of the brain in wood and ivory, and some waxes.

In 1830, thanks to the work of Luigi Rolando, the collection was increased by new finds and opened to the public for the first time. These expansions included some of what is now the Museo Egizio of Turin.

Between 1837 and 1898, under the direction of Carlo Giacomini, the collection is still being expanded with the addition of anatomical specimens in alcohol and dry. The spread of the evolutionary theory of Charles Darwin encourages the development of anthropological collections and primatological.

In 1898, with the completion of the building of anatomical studies, the museum was moved to its permanent headquarters.

== Collections ==
The museum, in addition to the collection of purely anatomical features, also contains anthropological collections, phrenological, primatological, artistic and period instruments. There is also a library and an archive of documents and photographs.

The museum contains a collection of 200 human wax models.

== See also ==
- Media related to Museo di anatomia umana Luigi Rolando at Wikimedia Commons
