= Luiz Roberto Tommasi =

Luiz Roberto Tommasi is a Brazilian zoologist who specialises in Echinoderms. As of 2013 he works at the Oceanographic Institute of the University of São Paulo, Brazil.

Tommasi took a Bachelor and Licenciatura in Natural History at the University of São Paulo between 1950 and 1957. He was awarded a Doctor of Science degree from the university in 1969: the title of his dissertation was "Os Equinodermos da região da Ilha Grande" ("The Echinoderms of the Ilha Grande region").
