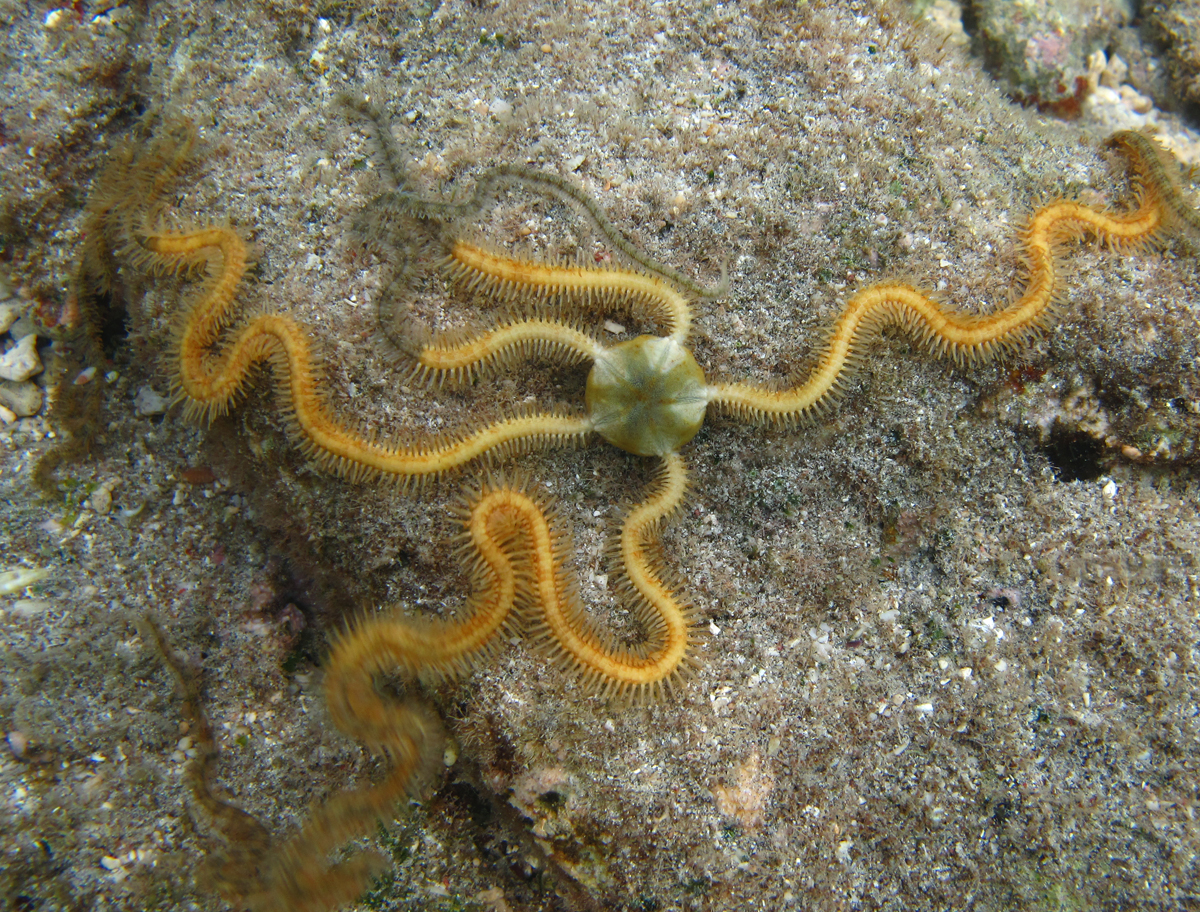
- Ophiocentrus aspera

Scientific classification
- Kingdom: Animalia
- Phylum: Echinodermata
- Class: Ophiuroidea
- Order: Amphilepidida
- Superfamily: Amphiuroidea
- Family: Amphiuridae; Ljungman, 1867

Type genus
- Amphiura Forbes, 1843

Genera
- 27, see text

= Amphiuridae =

Amphiuridae Temporal range: 149.2–0 Ma Late Jurassic to Present

Family of brittle stars

Amphiuridae (commonly called long-armed burrowing brittle stars or burrowing brittle stars) is a large family of brittle stars of the superfamily Amphiuroidea in the suborder Gnathophiurina.

== Description ==
Amphiuridae are generally small brittle stars. Their jaws are always with two apical papillae at the tip, and one or more papillae on each side. Some species are used to study echinoderm development (e.g. Amphipholis kochii and Amphioplus (Amphioplus) abditus) and bioluminescence (the dwarf brittle star (Amphipholis squamata).

Though most amphiurid brittle stars broadcast their eggs and sperm into the sea, many species in this family are "brooders" and carry their young in bursae. One species, Amphiodia akosmos from the Monterey Peninsula of California, was found with up to 11 brooding embryos in one adult (Hendler and Bundrick, 2001).

Fossils from this family have been found dating back to the Tithonian in the Late Jurassic.

== Ecology ==
Amphiuridae are found in oceans worldwide from tropics to Arctic and Antarctic regions, with some species living in brackish water. They live mostly by burrowing in the seafloor or hiding under rocks. Most of them are herbivores feeding directly on algae, or detritivores, using their long arms to direct organic materials towards their mouths.

== Taxonomy ==
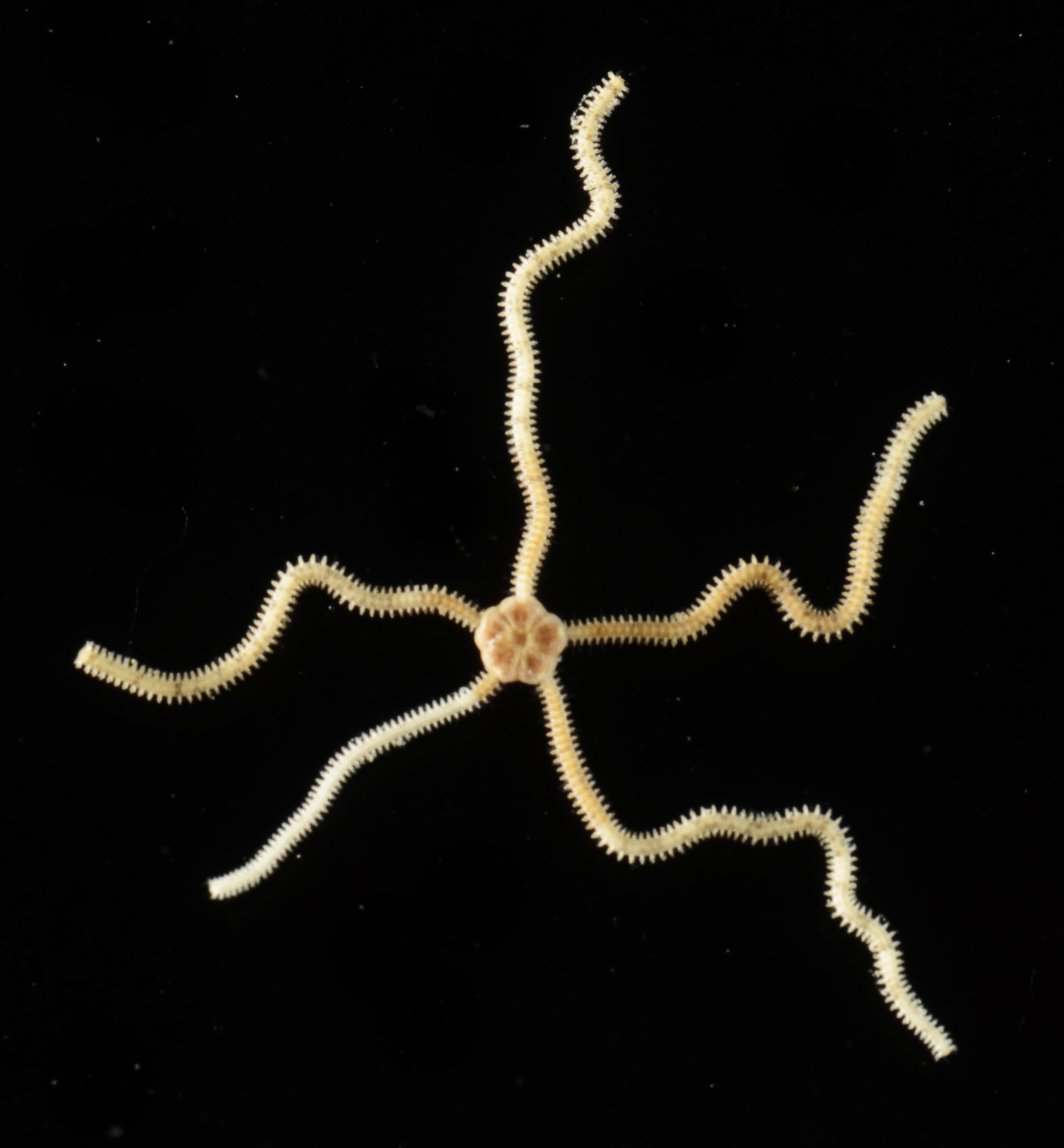
Amphiodia pulchella

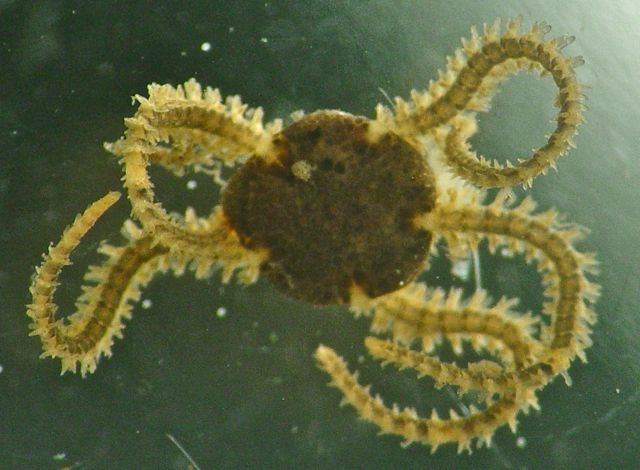
Amphipholis squamata

The phylogenetic tree per O'Hara et al. (2017) is as follows.

- Gnathophiurina
  - - - Ophiactoidea
        - - - Ophiotrichidae
            - Ophiopholidae
          - - Ophiactidae
        - - Ophiothamnidae
  - Amphiuroidea
    - Amphiuridae
    - Amphilepididae

Amphiuridae are the most diverse family of brittle stars with over 200 species. The family contains the following 27 genera.

- Acrocnida Gislén, 1926
- Amphichondrius Nielsen, 1932
- Amphicontus Hill, 1940
- Amphiodia Verrill, 1899
- Amphiomya H.L. Clark, 1939
- Amphioncus Clark, 1939
- Amphioplus Verrill, 1899
- Amphipholis Ljungman, 1966
- Amphipholizona Clark, 1915
- Amphistigma H.L. Clark, 1938
- Amphiura Forbes, 1843
- Deckersamphiura† Jagt & Kutscher, 2000
- Dougaloplus A.M. Clark, 1970
- Nannophiura Mortensen, 1933
- Nudamphiura Tommasi, 1965
- Ophiocentrus Ljungman, 1867
- Ophiocnida Lyman, 1865
- Ophiodaphne Koehler, 1930
- Ophionephthys Lütken, 1869
- Ophiophragmus Lyman, 1865
- Ophiosphaera Brock, 1888
- Ophiostigma Lütken, 1856
- Paracrocnida Mortensen, 1940
- Paramphichondrius Guille & Wolff, 1984
- Paramphiura Koehler, 1895
- Silax Fell, 1962
- Xanthamphiura† Hess, 1970
