= Apicystis =

Scientific classification
- Domain: Eukaryota
- Clade: Sar
- Clade: Alveolata
- Phylum: Apicomplexa
- Class: Conoidasida
- Order: Neogregarinorida
- Family: Lipotrophidae
- Genus: Apicystis

Species
- Apicystis bombi

Genus of single-celled organisms

Apicystis is a genus of parasitic alveolates of the phylum Apicomplexa.

== Taxonomy ==
There are two species currently recognized in this genus: A. bombi and A. cryptica

== History ==
Apicystis bombi was first described by Liu in 1974 as a species in the genus Mattesia.

In 1996, Lipa and Triggiani transferred this organism to a new genus Apicystis on the basis of morphology and life cycle.

In 2020, Schoonavere et al. described A. cryptica, associated to the bumble bees Bombus pascuorum, B. sichelii and B. veteranus

== Description ==
The species in this genus are spread by the orofaecal route.

Oocysts are ingested. Within the intestine these develop into sporozoites.

The sporozoites penetrate the gut wall and invade the haemocoele subsequently taking up residence in the fat body.

== Host records ==
This genus infects a number of hosts

- Apis mellifera
- Bombus dahlbomii
- Bombus ephippiatus
- Bombus hortorum
- Bombus pratorum
- Bombus ruderatus
- Bombus terrestris
- Bombus vagans
- Bombus impatiens
- Bombus griseocollis
- Bombus bimaculatus
