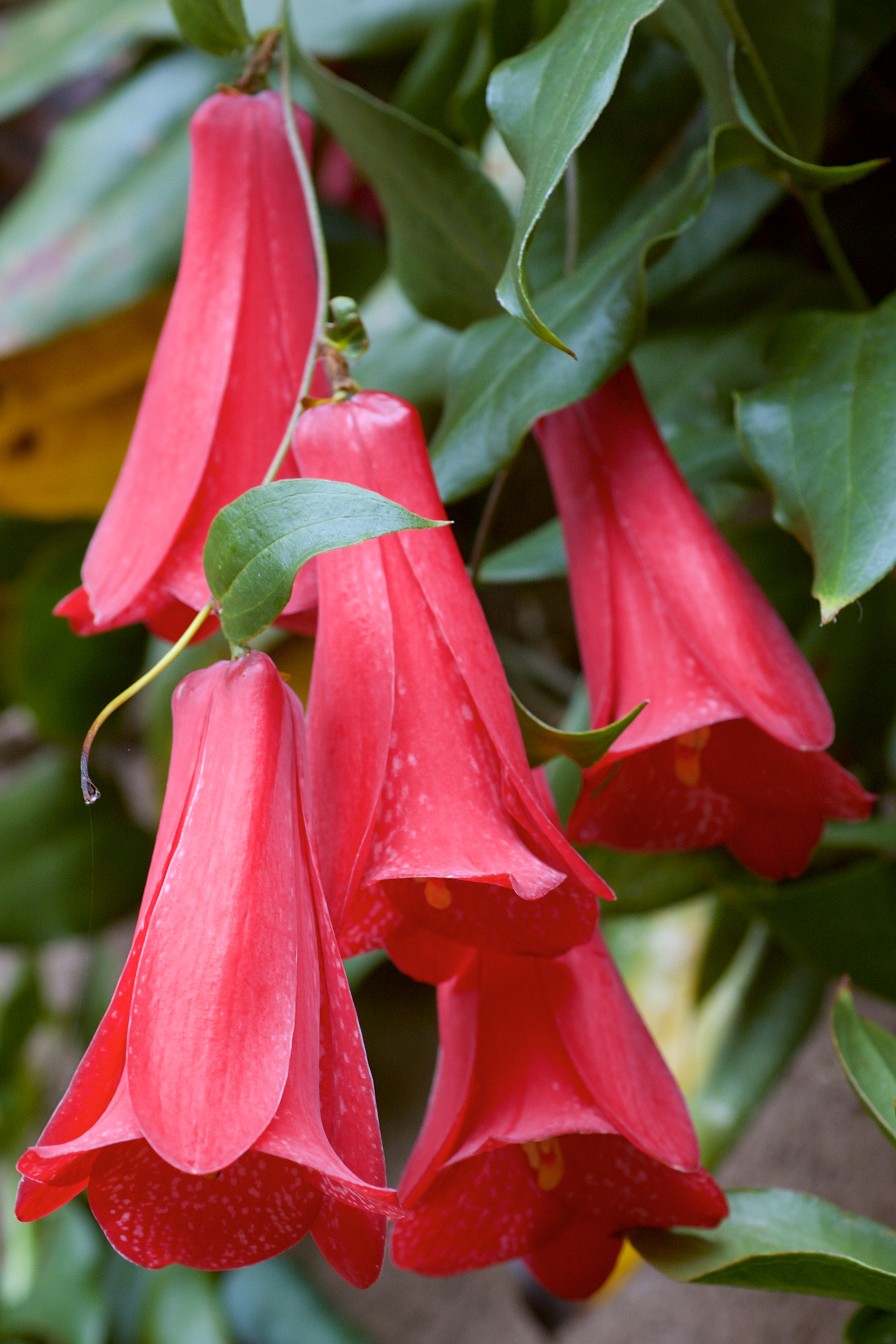

Scientific classification
- Kingdom: Plantae
- Clade: Embryophytes
- Clade: Tracheophytes
- Clade: Angiosperms
- Clade: Monocots
- Order: Liliales
- Family: Philesiaceae
- Genus: Lapageria; Ruiz & Pav.
- Species: L. rosea

Binomial name
- Lapageria rosea Ruiz & Pav.
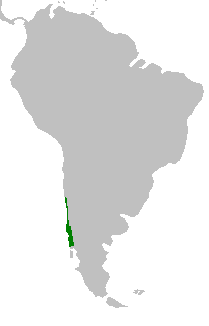
- Distribution area of Lapageria rosea

Synonyms
- Philesia rosea (Ruiz & Pav.) D.Dietr.; Lapageria hookeri Bridges ex Hook.; Lapageria alba Decne.

= Lapageria =

Genus of flowering plants

Lapageria is a genus of flowering plants with only one known species, Lapageria rosea, commonly known as Chilean bellflower or copihue (Spanish pronunciation: [ko'piwe], from Mapudungun kopiwe). Lapageria rosea is endemic to Chile and it is the national flower of this country. It grows in forests in the southern part of Chile, being part of the Valdivian temperate rainforests ecoregion flora.

Although the IUCN has not evaluated its conservation status, Lapageria rosea was officially declared "in serious danger of extinction" by the Chilean government in 1971. The copihue, which has inspired Mapuche legends and has been celebrated in both Chilean literature and music, was officially declared the national flower of Chile on February 24, 1977.

== Description ==
Lapageria rosea is an evergreen climbing plant reaching over 10 metres (33 ft) high among shrubs and trees. The leaves are arranged alternately and are evergreen, leathery, lanceolate and feature three to seven prominent parallel veins. The vines twine counterclockwise in the Southern hemisphere and clockwise when grown in the Northern hemisphere (likely due to the apparent motion of the sun).

The flowers have six thick, waxy tepals which are most commonly red, spotted with white. They are most frequently produced in late summer and fall, although they may be produced at other times. The fruit is an elongated berry with a tough skin containing numerous small seeds about the size of a tomato seed, which are covered in an edible fleshy arils. In the wild the plant is pollinated by hummingbirds.

=== Pollination ===
Pollen is distributed by birds, mostly hummingbirds, and also insects and other animals. The flower form is of the syndrome of specialization for hummingbird pollination. Insect pollinators include: Bombus dahlbomii (native species to southern South America) and Bombus terrestris and Bombus ruderatus (both of which are not native to southern South America, and, instead, invasive).

== Historical usage ==
In the past its fruit was sold in markets, but the plant has now become rare through over-collection and forest clearance.

The roots were once collected and used as a substitute for sarsaparilla. In 1977 the plant was given legal protection in Chile.

== Etymology ==
Lapageria is named for Marie Joséphine Rose Tascher de la Pagerie (1763-1814), also known as Napoleon's Empress Josephine, who was a keen collector of plants for her garden at Château de Malmaison. Rosea means 'flushed rose' or 'flushed pink'.

The name of the fruit in Mapudungun is actually kopiw (derived from kopün, "to be upside down"), which is the etymon of Spanish copihue; the Mapuche call the plant kolkopiw (colcopihue in Spanish, which may also refer to the whole plant). The flower is called kodkülla in the indigenous language.

== Botany ==
Lapageria rosea is related to Philesia magellanica (syn. P. buxifolia), another plant from the Valdivian flora, having similar flowers, but shrubby rather than climbing. ×Philageria veitchii is a hybrid between L. rosea and P. magellanica. It is more similar in appearance to the former.

== Cultivation ==
The plant was introduced to Britain by William Lobb during his plant collecting expedition to the Valdivian temperate rain forests in 1845–1848 and was growing at Kew in 1847.

In cultivation the plant requires a shaded, sheltered position with acid or neutral soil. It is hardy down to −5 °C (23 °F), so in the UK can be grown outside in mild or coastal areas. It has gained the Royal Horticultural Society's Award of Garden Merit.

=== Cultivars ===
There are numerous named garden cultivars, mostly developed at one nursery in Chile, with flower colour varying from deep red through pink to pure white (L. rosea 'Albiflora'), and some with variegated flowers.

In the United States, UC Botanical Garden at the University of California at Berkeley has one of the largest collections of the Lapageria genus with around 24 named and unnamed cultivars in its collection. This collection was started by T Harper Goodspeed, botany professor at UCB and alternately curator or director of the gardens from 1919–1957. The University established a relationship with El Vergel Farm, a Methodist mission and agricultural school in Angol, Chile which housed the largest collection of named cultivars and wild lapagerias in the world.

=== Propagation ===
To obtain fruit in cultivation it is generally necessary to pollinate by hand if there are not native hummingbirds. Chilean bellflower can be propagated from cuttings, layering and fresh seeds. Some cultivars are self-fruitful, but better pollination is achieved with differing parents. Germination is best with fresh moist seed; dried seeds take special treatment and have a much poorer germination rate. Propagation of cultivars is by cuttings (usually rooted under mist), layering, or division. Seedlings take from three to ten years to flower. Cuttings usually flower more quickly.

== Economic importance and uses ==
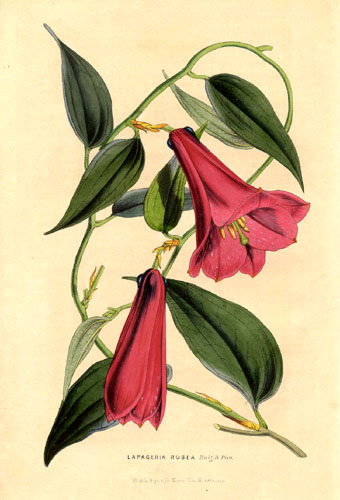
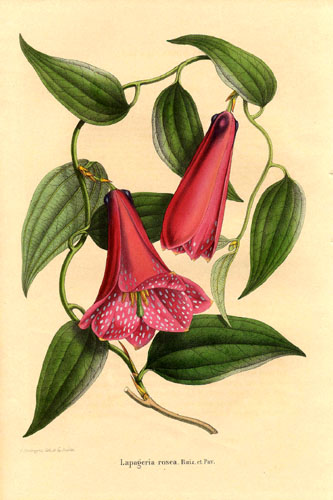
Lapageria rosea was featured in the journals Flore des Serres et des Jardins de l'Europe and Annales de la Société royale d'Agriculture et de Botanique de Gand in 1849, with hand-colored lithographs by Charles Lemaire

The species is regarded as "highly valued for the beauty of its flowers and for its fruits".

Following its introduction to Europe in the late 1840s, the naturalist Claudio Gay noted in 1853 that "it may be assumed that it will soon become one of the most sought-after plants by horticulturists and garden enthusiasts". Hand-colored lithographs of the species appeared throughout the second half of the 19th century in scientific and horticultural journals such as Flore des Serres et des Jardins de l'Europe (1849), Annales de la Société royale d'Agriculture et de Botanique de Gand – Journal d'horticulture (1849), Maandschrift voor tuinbouw (c. 1852), La Belgique horticole, journal des jardins et des vergers (1853), and Revue de l'horticulture belge et étrangère (1882).

The species is distinguished primarily by its value as an ornamental plant. In 2012, the characteristics of Lapageria rosea var. albiflora were recognized with the Award of Garden Merit (AGM), granted by the Royal Horticultural Society of the United Kingdom.

In addition, its fruits are edible, described as "sweet, very pleasant to the taste, and highly refreshing". The species also has other uses: in phytotherapy or herbal medicine, its roots are used to treat ailments such as gout, rheumatism, and certain sexually transmitted infections, while its stems are used in basketry—for example, in the making of chaihues, a type of basket used as a strainer.

== Cultural importance ==
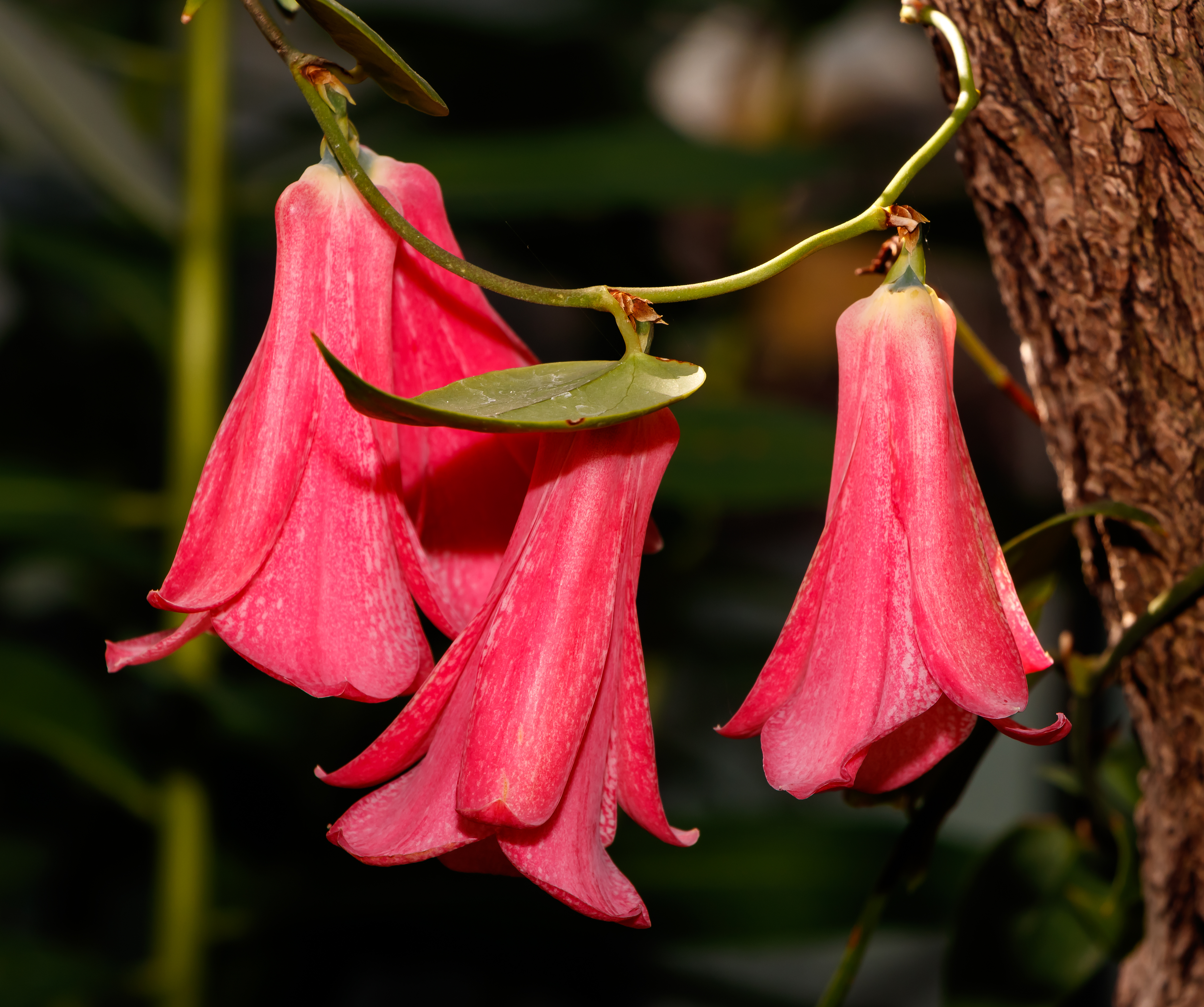
Red copihue

The red flower of the wild variety has inspired Mapuche legends and has been celebrated in both Chilean literature and music.

=== Legends ===
One legend recounts that during the Arauco War (1536–1818), the women of the weichafes ("warriors") climbed the tallest trees to look for survivors after the battles. When they realized that destruction prevailed and that their companions lay dead, they descended shedding tears that turned into flowers of blood; thus, the red copihues are said to commemorate the spirits of the dead.

Another legend tells of a wekufe who lived in the mountain peaks and descended into the valleys to steal muday (type of beverage made by fermenting cereal grains such as corn or wheat, or seeds such as pine nuts) from the Mapuche. To avoid losing his way back, he placed small glowing bells, lit with volcanic fire, on the branches of trees. During one of his raids, he was defeated by pillanes and banished. Although he begged to take the little bells with him to light his path, the higher spirits denied his request. Since then, the forests have been adorned with the red copihue flowers, the former lights of the muday thief.

=== Literature ===
The copihue has been the subject of several literary works, such as the poem "El copihue rojo" (1905) (Note: This poem was later set to music by Arturo Arancibia Uribe and recorded by Chilean singers Ludovico Muzzio, Rayén Quitral, and Lucho Gatica, among others) by Ignacio Verdugo Cavada, later published in El alma de Chile (1961), and "Recado sobre el copihue chileno" by Nobel laureate Gabriela Mistral, published in the Argentine newspaper La Nación in September 1943. El país de los copihues rojos (1949) by Claudina Agurto Montesino, and in the memoirs of Nobel laureate Pablo Neruda, Confieso que he vivido (1974), which include the following passage:

En la altura, como gotas arteriales de la selva mágica, se cimbran los copihues rojos (Lapageria rosea)... El copihue rojo es la flor de la sangre, el copihue blanco es la flor de la nieve...

(High above, like arterial drops of the magical forest, the red copihues sway (Lapageria rosea)... The red copihue is the flower of blood; the white copihue is the flower of snow...)

=== Music ===
At the beginning of the 20th century, the musician Osmán Pérez Freire composed the song "Copihues rojos." Later, musicologist Clara Solovera wrote the tonada "Chile lindo" (1948), which references the copihue both in its opening verse and in the chorus:

Ayúdeme usted, compadre, pa' gritar un ¡viva Chile!, la tierra de los zorzales y de los rojos copihues [...] Chile, Chile lindo, lindo como un sol, aquí mismito te dejo hecho un copihue mi corazón.

(Help me, my friend, to shout a "long live Chile!", the land of the thrushes and the red copihues [...] Chile, Chile dear, dear as the sun, right here I leave you my heart made into a copihue.)

The folklorist Violeta Parra included "Floreció el copihue rojo" in her album El folklore de Chile, vol. III – La cueca presentada por Violeta Parra (1958), a compilation of popular and traditional Chilean cuecas.

=== Other uses ===
==== Heraldry and vexillology ====
Coat of arms of Arauco, Chile

Coat of arms of La Araucania

The flower of this species is frequently depicted in heraldry as "having three petals (two lateral and one lower central), oriented toward the point of the shield, sometimes with leaves and stem or even within its vine, and colored gules (red)."

It appears on the municipal coats of arms of thirteen communes: Treguaco in the Ñuble Region; Arauco, Hualqui, Lebu, Los Álamos, and Tirúa in the Biobío Region; and Angol, Los Sauces, Pitrufquén, Purén, Renaico, Temuco, and Victoria in the Araucanía Region. In the latter region, it is also featured in the regional coat of arms, which consists of two black and red quarters adorned with six white guemiles and a trapelacucha of the same color, surrounded by a garland of copihues and crowned by a snow-capped mountain flanked by araucaria trees.

The emblem of the football club Deportes Temuco displays a red copihue with green leaves. Symbolizing "love of the homeland", a white copihue forms part of the emblem of the Communist Youth of Chile (JJ. CC., founded in 1932), while a red copihue with a green stem at the top was the symbol of the left-wing political party Acción Popular Independiente (API, 1968–1973).

The copihue appears in both versions of the flag of the Araucanía Region: the official version used by the regional government, consisting of the regional coat of arms on a white field, and an unofficial version featuring the coat of arms on three horizontal stripes—blue (top), white (middle), and red (bottom).

==== Numismatics, notaphily, and painting ====
In 1941, René Thenot, a French engraver contracted by the Chilean Mint, designed the reverse of the one-peso and fifty- and twenty-centavo coins with the denomination and year surrounded by a wreath of copihues.

Likewise, a cross section of the heart of a copihue appears in the unified design of the five banknotes of the Bicentennial Series (2009), issued by the Central Bank of Chile to commemorate the bicentennial of the country.

The copihue is also depicted in the mural Presencia de América Latina (1964–1965) by Mexican artist Jorge González Camarena, located in the entrance hall of the Casa del Arte at the University of Concepción.

==== Odonymy and toponymy ====
There are 103 streets named Los Copihues, making it the tenth most common street name in Chile.

At least two towns in central Chile bear the name: Copihue—and its surrounding Copihue railway station (1874) and Copihue airstrip, located in the commune of Retiro (Maule Region), and El Copihue, in the commune of San Carlos (Ñuble Region). Additionally, there are two rural localities called Copiulemu (from Mapudungun kopiw, the name of the copihue fruit, and lemu, "forest"): one in the commune of Pelluhue (Maule Region) and another that began to form around 1866 in what is now the commune of Florida (Biobío Region).

Other geographic features include Punta Copihues (Aysén Region); the Copihuelpi River, also known as the San José River (Los Ríos Region); Laguna del Copíu (Valparaíso Region); and Copiuguapi Island (from Mapudungun kopiw and wapi, "island"), also known as Capeahuapi and Capiraguapi (Los Lagos Region).

==== Awards, trophies, and mascots ====
The flower is the symbol of the "Copihue de Oro" awards (established in 2005), presented annually in December by the newspaper La Cuarta to honor figures in Chilean entertainment, as well as the "Copihue de Plata" trophy (since 2015), awarded by the National Professional Football Association (ANFP) to the champion of the Second Division.

Additionally, a copihue served as the mascot of the 2017 South American Under-17 Football Championship.

==== Miscellany ====
Among commercial products in Chile are the Copihue brand of the Chilean Match Company (founded in 1913) and mote con huesillos sold under the name Copihue, a beverage produced by a factory established in the commune of Independencia in the 1970s. In Chilean Spanish, hot dog buns are also known as pan de completo or pan copihue.

In the commune of Victoria (Araucanía Region), Radio Copihue FM was inaugurated in 1981 and currently covers the region with stations in Curacautín and Victoria. In the Las Lajas sector of the commune of San Clemente (Maule Region), the Festival del Copihue was held during the 1980s.

== Gallery ==
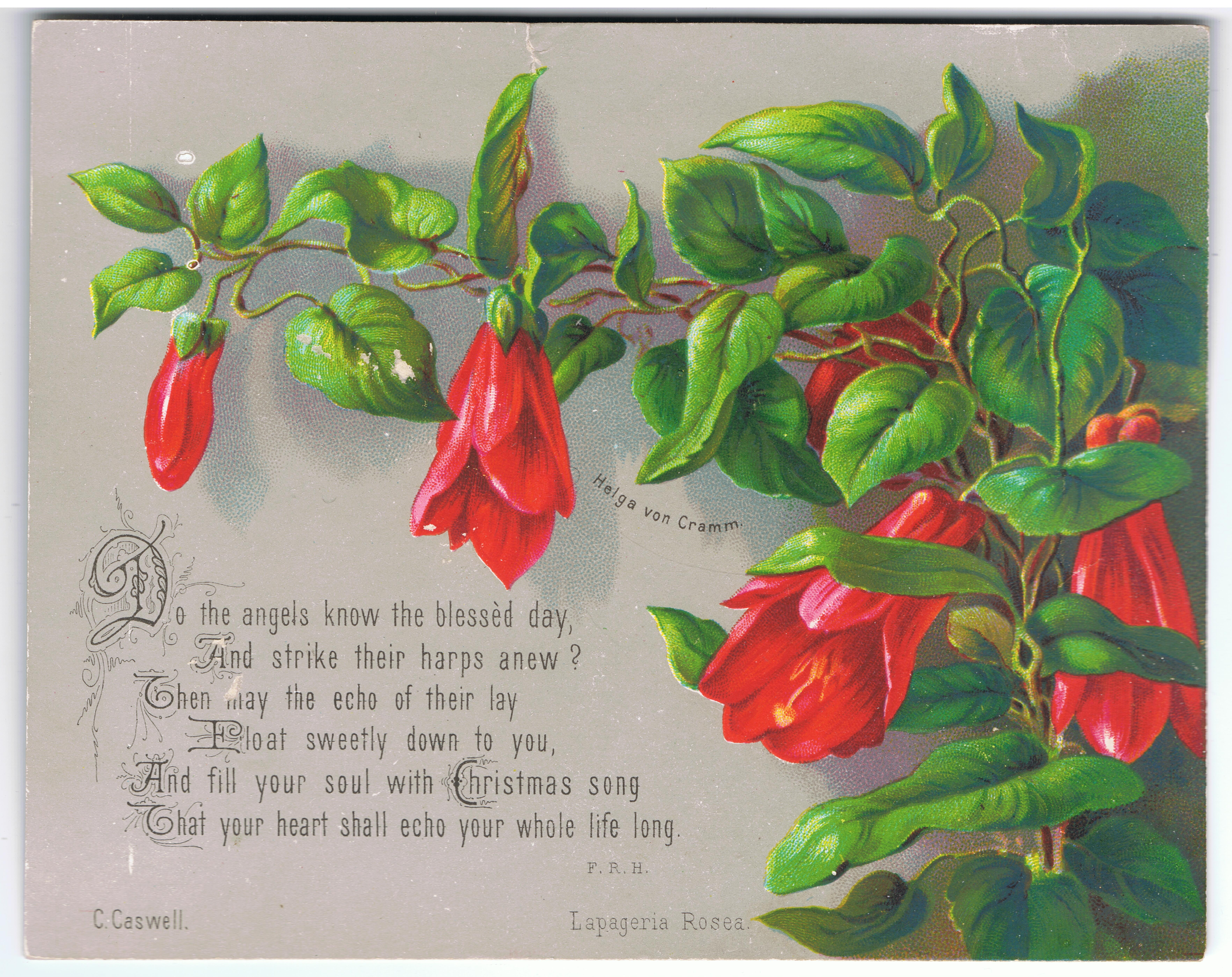
Lapageria Rosea, by Helga von Cramm, with verse by F.R. Havergal, 1870s.

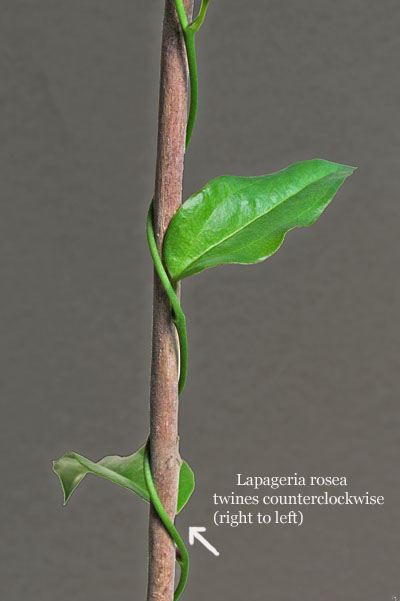
Stem twining counterclockwise

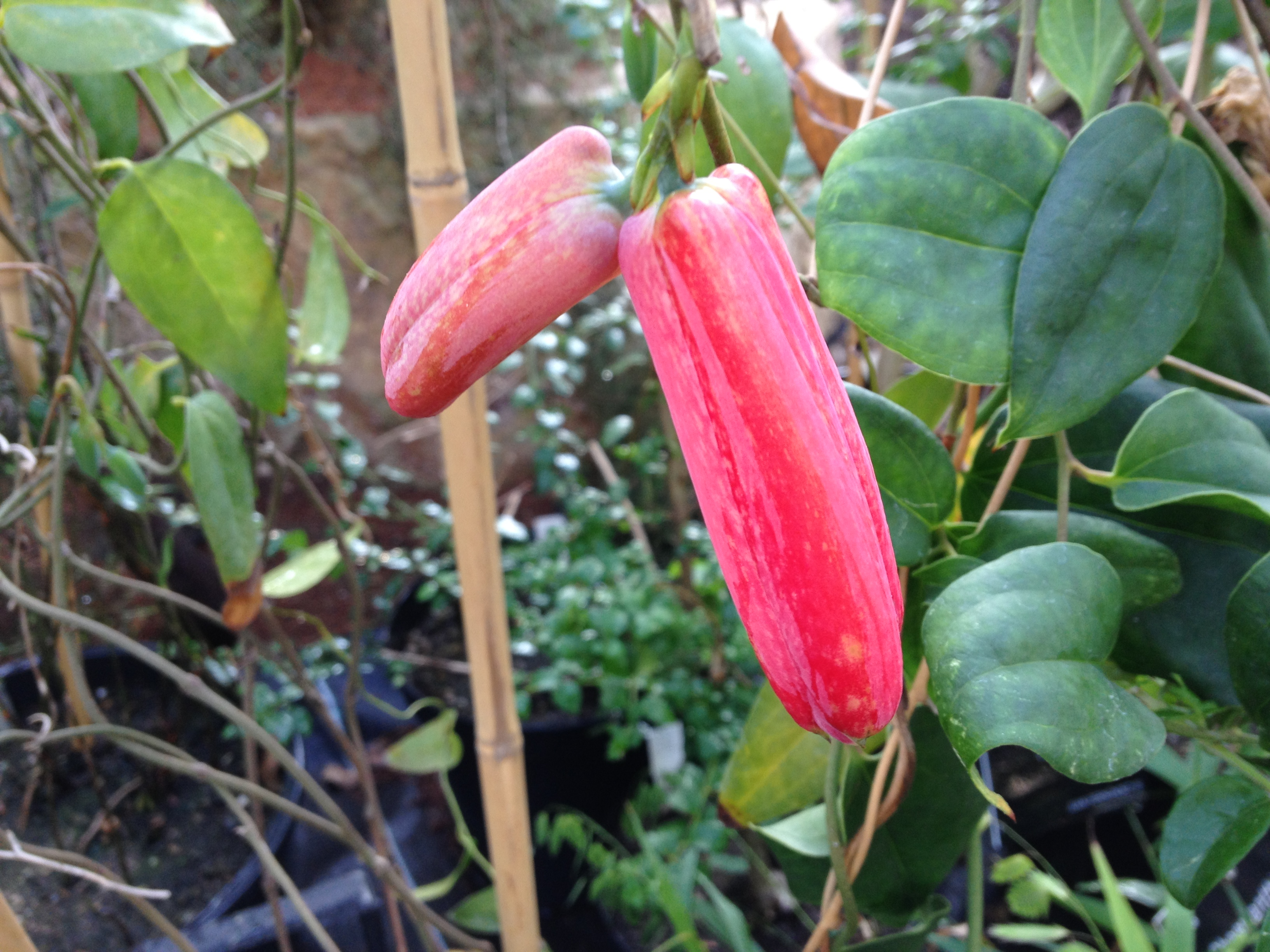
Buds in the Temperate House at the Royal Botanic Gardens, Kew

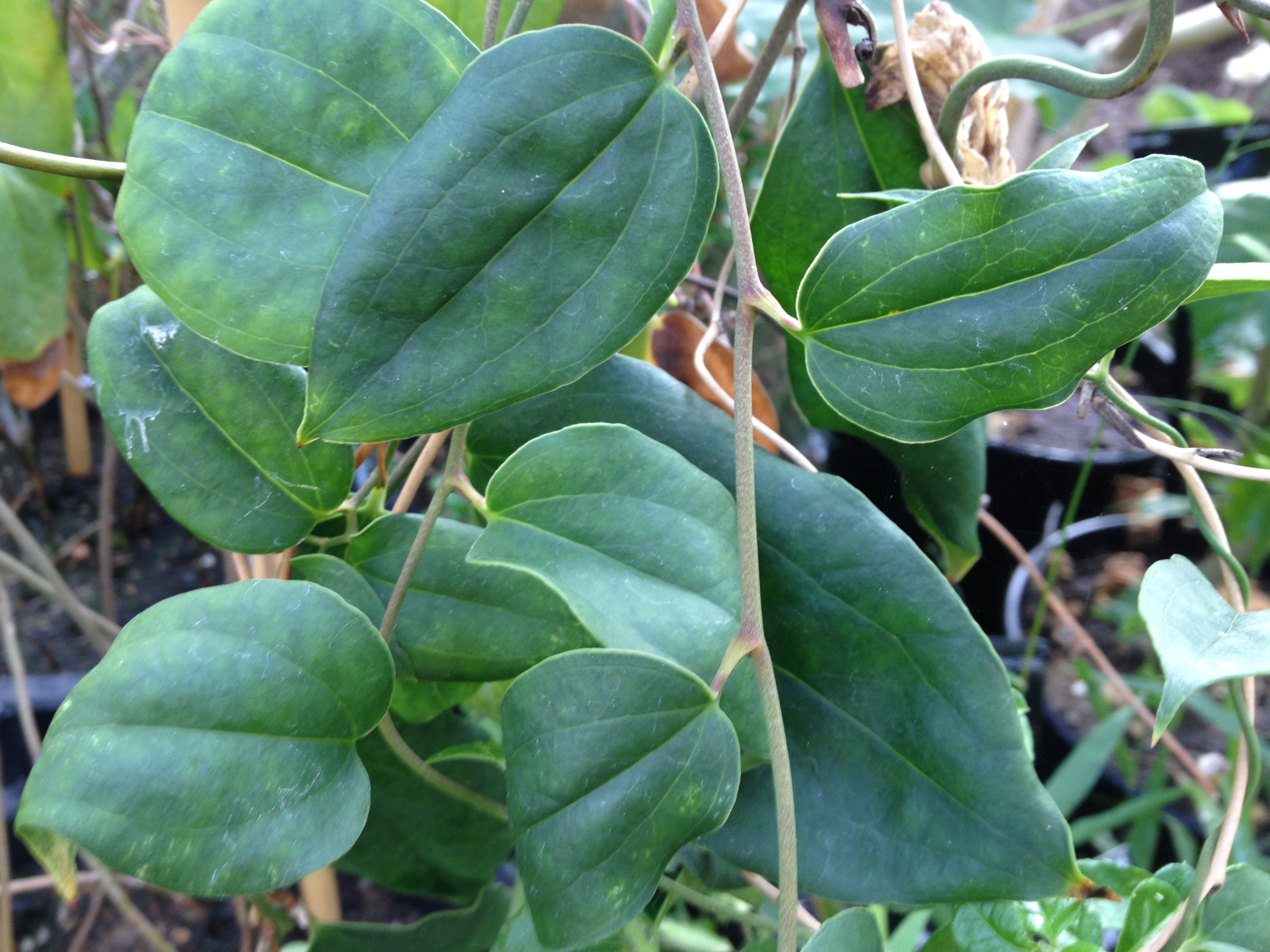
Foliage

== Bibliography ==
- Crandall, Chuck; Crandall, Barbara (1995). Flowering, Fruiting & Foliage Vines: a gardener's guide. New York: Sterling Publishing. ISBN 978-0-8069-0726-0. (Page 9 in the book illustrates clockwise and counterclockwise twining.)
- Grez, Audrey A; Bustamante, Ramiro O; Simonetti, Javier A & Fahrig, Lenore (1998). "Landscape Ecology, Deforestation, and Forest Fragmentation: the Case of the Ruil Forest in Chile". In Salinas Chávez, Eduardo & Middleton, John (eds.). Landscape Ecology as a Tool for Sustainable Development in Latin America. Brock University, California.
- Reed, Elbert E (1964). "The Chilean Bellflower, Copihue, Lapageria rosea". California Horticultural Society Journal. 25 (3).
- Riedemann, Paulina; Aldunate, Gustavo (2003). Flora nativa de valor ornamental : Chile zona sur (in Spanish). Santiago de Chile: Editorial Andres Bello. ISBN 978-956-13-1827-4.
- Ruiz, Hippolyto; Pavon, Josepho (1802). Flora Peruviana et Chilensis.
- Song, Leo. "Lapageria rosea, La Flor Nacional de Chile".
