= Apicystis bombi =

Scientific classification
- Domain: Eukaryota
- Clade: Sar
- Clade: Alveolata
- Phylum: Apicomplexa
- Class: Conoidasida
- Order: Neogregarinorida
- Family: Lipotrophidae
- Genus: Apicystis
- Species: A. bombi

Binomial name
- Apicystis bombi (Liu et al, 1974)

Synonyms
- Mattesia bombi

Species of apicomplexan

Apicystis bombi is a species of parasitic alveolates in the phylum Apicomplexa. It infects bees, especially bumblebees. It is believed to have a cosmopolitan distribution in bumblebees and a sporadic occurrence in honey bees, and causes disease symptoms in nonresistant bee species.

== Taxonomy ==
This protozoan was first described by Liu in 1974 as Mattesia bombi. In 1996, Lipa and Triggiani transferred it to the new genus Apicystis on the basis of morphology and life cycle.

== Distribution ==
This protozoan was found in Canada in overwintering queens and in males of various species of Bombus, with the half-black bumblebee (Bombus vagans) at 8% being the most heavily infected species. It was later identified in Bombus species in France, and also in Switzerland, where infection rates varied between 4 and 7%. The oocysts were found in Italy in the garden bumblebee (B. hortorum) and the buff-tailed bumblebee (B. terrestris) and in 1990, in Finland, were found in a single specimen of the honey bee (Apis mellifera). Further finds were made in Italy over the next few years with the level of infection in Bombus species being considered low and that in A. mellifera sporadic. With specimens being found in Canada, France, Italy, Finland and Switzerland, it is likely that the parasite is cosmopolitan in distribution and will be identified in other countries.

In 2009 the parasite was identified in Patagonia in A. mellifera, B. terrestris, and B. ruderatus, only the second occasion on which it had been found in a honeybee. However extensive sampling in the Pampas, the most productive honey-producing region of Argentina, failed to detect it there. Because there was only one detection in one specimen of Apis before, this (Plischuk et al 2011) is considered the first real detection. A. bombi's host range spanning Apis and Bombus may indicate that they are sharing gregarines at the shared pollen source. It is thought that the parasite was introduced in 1998 with commercially reared B. terrestris being imported into Chile for their use as pollinators. Apicystis bombi appears to have no adverse effects on B. terrestris. The introduction of B.terrestris into certain regions of Patagonia and southern South America (starting around the 1980s) have led to the rapid decline of Bombus dahlbomii populations in the area. A large part of this decline can be attributed to Apicystis bombi pathogen spillover. Unlike B. terretstris, B.dahlbomii does not have a natural resistance of A.bombi. A.bombi infection prevents B.dahlbomii from completing proper foraging behaviors by inducing a plethora of behavioral and physiological impairments. Although transmission is not well understood, Bombus affinis has also been adversely affected by the A. bombi. Incidence of infection has been observed in about 3% of all B. affinis, and has become particularly prevalent in northern Ontario. This parasite causes increased worker death and prevention of new colony formation.

In 2013 the parasite was identified, along with several others, to be infecting bumblebees imported into the UK and potentially in bumblebees imported around Europe. In 2014 the parasite was identified to be present in a large numbers of bumblebees in England. This prevalence was greatest in bumblebees which foraged close to farms using commercial (imported) bumblebees. Whilst it's not clear if this pattern is a result of parasite spillover, it is clear that the prevalence in England is far greater than previously detected.

== Life cycle ==
Oocysts are ingested by the bee and sporozoites develop from these in the intestine. They migrate through the wall of the gut before taking up residence in the fat body cells, where they develop and multiply. The presence of the pathogen gives the fat tissue a white appearance but microscopic examination of the tissue is required to confirm the presence of oocysts.

== Effects ==
The effects of Apicystis bombi differ between host species. Heavily infected bees are rare, but this may be due to high pathogenicity of the neogregarine. Infected workers have increased mortality, reduced fatbody and increased sensitivity to sucrose. Infected queen bumblebees are unlikely to survive hibernation which is thought to be due to the reduced fatbody of infected queens. There is also some evidence that Deformed wing virus may reduce some of the negative effects of Apicystis bombi.
