= Mattesia =

Scientific classification
- Domain: Eukaryota
- Clade: Sar
- Superphylum: Alveolata
- Phylum: Apicomplexa
- Class: Conoidasida
- Order: Neogregarinorida
- Family: Lipotrophidae
- Genus: Mattesia; Naville, 1930

Species
- Mattesia alphitobii Mattesia dispora Mattesia geminata Mattesia grandis Mattesia povolnyi Mattesia orchopiae Mattesia oryzaephili Mattesia trogodermae

Synonyms
- Coelogregarina Ghélélovitch, 1948

Genus of single-celled organisms

Mattesia is a genus of parasitic alveolates of the phylum Apicomplexa. Species in this genus infect insects (Coleoptera, Hymenoptera, Lepidoptera and Siphonaptera).

== Taxonomy ==
The genus was described in 1930 by Naville.

There are eight recognised species in this genus.

The type species is Mattesia geminata.

== Host records ==
- Mattesia alphitobii — lesser mealworm (Alphitobius diaperinus)
- Mattesia dispora — Indianmeal moth (Plodia interpunctella)
- Mattesia geminata — fire ant (Solenopsis geminata)
- Mattesia grandis — boll weevil (Anthonomus grandis)
- Mattesia orchopiae — flea (Orchopeas wickhami)
- Mattesia oryzaephili — sawtoothed grain beetle (Oryzaephilus surinamensis)
- Mattesia povolnyi — Eurasian sunflower moth (Homoeosoma nebulellum)
- Mattesia trogodermae — Glabrous cabinet beetle (Trogoderma glabrum)

== Notes ==
Coelogregarina Ghélélovitch, 1948 is a synonym of Mattersia.

Mattesia bombi has been moved to a new genus — Apicystis bombi.
