= Lipocystis =

Scientific classification
- Domain: Eukaryota
- Clade: Sar
- Superphylum: Alveolata
- Phylum: Apicomplexa
- Class: Conoidasida
- Order: Neogregarinorida
- Family: Lipotrophidae
- Genus: Lipocystis; Grell, 1938
- Species: L. polyspora

Binomial name
- Lipocystis polyspora Grell, 1938

Genus of single-celled organisms

Lipocystis is a genus of parasitic alveolates of the phylum Apicomplexa.

Species in this genus infect insects.

== Taxonomy ==
This genus was described by Grell in 1938. Grell observed the parasite during his work for his PhD thesis.

The only recognised species in this genus is Lipocystis polyspora.

== Description ==
The life cycle of this parasite occurs within the fat body of the host. Transmission is via the oro-faecal route.

The infective sporozoites are fusiform. Once ingested the sporozoites invade the wall of the gut en route to the fat body.

After invasion the sporozoites enlarge into rounded micronuclear meronts (nuclear diameter = 1 micron).

This first round of merogony produces merozoites with small nuclei which their turn become meronts.

The second generation meronts produce two types of merozoites either with large nuclei which again give rise to merozoites or spheroidal gamonts.

The gamonts enlarge and pair in syzygy.

This pairing in its turn leads to the formation of multinucleate gametocytes.

These gametocytes form gametes which are released and fuse.

After gamete fusion a zygote results.

Within each zygote up to 200 navicular (boat like) oocysts may form.

Each oocyst contains 8 sporozoites.

== Host records ==
This species infects the scorpion fly (Panorpa communis).
