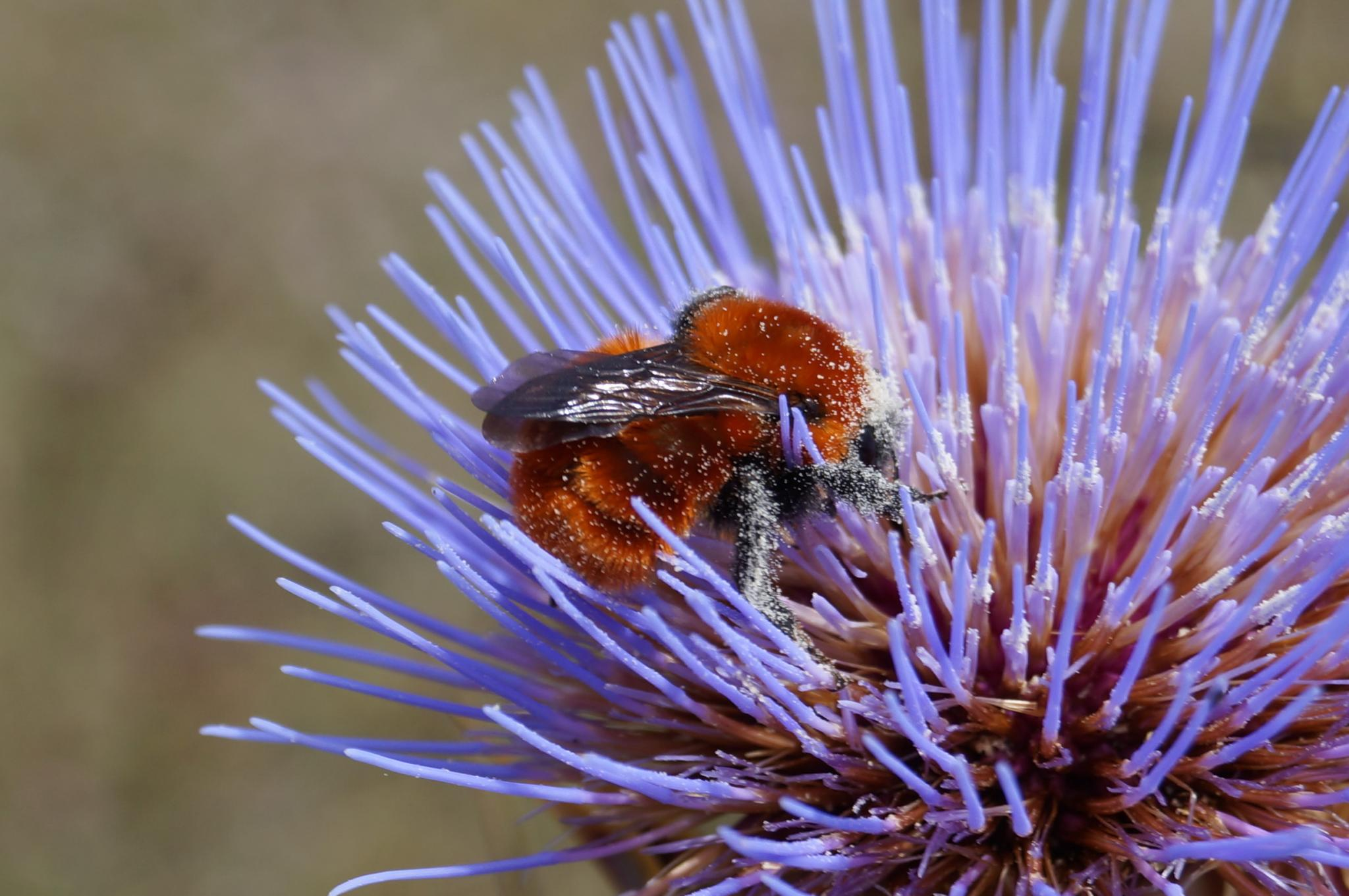

Conservation status
- Endangered (IUCN 3.1)

Scientific classification
- Kingdom: Animalia
- Phylum: Arthropoda
- Clade: Pancrustacea
- Class: Insecta
- Order: Hymenoptera
- Family: Apidae
- Genus: Bombus
- Species: B. dahlbomii

Binomial name
- Bombus dahlbomii Guérin-Méneville, 1835

= Bombus dahlbomii =

Species of bee

Bombus dahlbomii, also known as the moscardón (or mangangá, from Guarani: mamanga), is a species of bumblebee endemic to southern South American temperate forests. B. dahlbomii is one of the largest bee species in the world, with matured queens growing up to 40 mm (1.6 in) long. Because of its size and furry appearance, the species has been described as "flying mice" colloquially, and "a monstrous fluffy ginger beast" by British ecologist David Goulson.

B. dahlbomii is native to southern Chile and southern Argentina, including Patagonia. The decline of its populations started with the introduction of Bombus terrestris and B. ruderatus into Chile to serve as commercial pollinators. B. dahlbomii population decline can also be attributed to the pathogen spillover of the parasitic protozoan Apicystis bombi, which was co-introduced with B. terrestris.

B. dahlbomii is an important insect in local ecosystems, such as the Maulino forest of central Chile. There, it is a major pollinator of native plants such as Lapageria rosea and Alstroemeria aurea, both of which serve important commercial purposes.

== Taxonomy ==
The species was originally described in 1835 by the French entomologist Félix Édouard Guérin-Méneville.

== Description and identification ==
B. dahlbomii is predominantly red-orange in color. The thorax of the bee is completely red-orange while the abdomen is generally a lighter shade of orange with a small amount of lightening/discoloration towards the end. Like most bumblebees, the abdomen of the bee has a rounded tip. The head, wing and leg region of B. dahlbomii are distinctly black in color. B. dahlbomii has relatively short antennae and a distinct forewing and smaller hindwing that are usually tucked in above the main thorax area (they lie almost flat). Relatively long bristles cover almost the whole thorax and abdomen of B. dahlbomii, giving the bumblebee an extremely furry appearance. The leg and head regions are covered by shorter bristles than the thorax and abdomen. B. dahlbomii queens usually have relatively heavy body masses of around 0.5-1.5 grams and large head-to-tail lengths of up to 4 cm. These measurements make B. dahlbomii one of the largest bumblebees in the world and give it the nickname the "flying mouse".

== Distribution and habitat ==
B. dahlbomii is the only native bumblebee species in southern South America. Its range extends from 30 degrees southwards to the southern tip of mainland South America. It is endemic to temperate forest regions in central/southern Patagonia. B. dahlbomii is distributed throughout Patagonia, where it coexists with two non-native species that belong to the same genus, Bombus terrestris and Bombus ruderatus. In its distribution in Chile and Argentina, including Patagonia, B. dahlbomii occupies forest environments that have both continuous and fragmented (scattered) distribution of plants, flowers and other resources. Individuals in these two environments have slightly different morphological and behavioral features. Although some reports cite B. dahlbomii outside of southern South America, they fail to substantiate their findings; when compared to other South American bumblebees, B. dahlbomii's range is relatively confined.

== Colony cycle ==
Individual B. dahlbomii queens usually start colonies in the spring by first locating underground cavities, such as rodent burrows. Like many other species in the genus Bombus, the B. dahlbomii colony cycle begins with the production of the egg cell structure inside the underground cavity. This egg cell structure is constructed from a mixture of pollen and wax that the queen forages from the outside environment and brings to the nest site. Eventually, the queen lays her first brood of eggs in this egg cell structure. After a couple of months, in early summer or late spring, this initial brood produces the first B. dahlbomii workers that take over foraging responsibilities from the queen. Males and new queens are subsequently produced to allow the continuation of the colony cycle. The initial period during which the B. dahlbomii queen is alone without workers is referred to as the subsocial phase. The social phase starts when the initial eggs mature into workers that can begin basic foraging activities. Field studies indicate that B. dahlbomii nests can host populations of upwards of 100 workers.

== Behavior ==
=== Queen behavior ===
B. dahlbomii queens initiate colonies. Queens forage for nectar and pollen that are used to feed the initial brood of a new colony nest site. The foraging activity of queens usually stops once the first brood develops into fully mature workers that can forage to feed immature siblings and alleviate the queen's need to perform such duties. After this happens, the queen assumes her main role of laying and incubating the brood eggs to further propagate the colony and produce new workers. Once workers begin foraging activities, B. dahlbomii queens seem to venture out of nests less frequently, but are still found in the outside of nests quite often.

=== Color detection ===
Scientific research indicates that most bees cannot see the color red, as their photoreceptors are more sensitive to short (UV, blue, green) rather than long wavelengths of light. As a result, bees generally avoid red colored flowers, which are typically pollinated by birds. Although B. dahlbomii distinguishes colors in much the same way as other bees, it frequently visits certain species of red flowers, such as Crinodendron hookerianum, Lapageria rosea, Asteranthera ovata and Embothrium coccineum, that are common in South American temperate forests. Such behavior sets B. dahlbomii apart from most other bee species that do not visit red colored flowers as frequently. This somewhat peculiar behavior can be attributed to B. dahlbomii's ability to rely on a specific receptor system, the L-receptor system, to perform achromatic contrast and detect and distinguish the color red. Research on the B. dahlbomii L-receptor receptor system has forced experts to partially change the ways they think about bumblebee light/color sensitivity.

=== Foraging ===
B. dahlbomii forages both nectar and pollen from a wide variety of plants, including Lapageria rosea, Alstroemeria aurea, Eucryphia cordifolia, Crinodendron hookerianum and Embothrium coccineum. B. dahlbomii individuals show both short and relatively long distance foraging patterns. Short distance foraging patterns arise in continuous, resource rich situations where workers can gather the necessary nectar from plants that exist close to the nest site. Long distance foraging patterns develop in resource poor environments such as fragmented forests; long distance foragers usually have to deal with harsher environmental/temporal conditions as well, including faster wind gusts. In general, B. dahlbomii spends more time foraging on each flower than other related species of bumblebees. Researchers attribute this slower foraging behavior to B. dahlbomii's bigger size and heavier body, which partially precludes it from fast movements. B. dahlbomii's relatively short tongue may also prevent it from performing rapid foraging patterns.

== Interaction with other species ==
=== Invasive species ===
In regions of South America (Chile, Patagonia), B. dahlbomii coexists and competes with two other species, Bombus terrestris and Bombus ruderatus, that are congeneric with B. dahlbomii. B. terrestris and B. ruderatus were introduced into Patagonia for commercial purposes 30 years ago in order to increase the seed and fruit yields of cultivated crops in orchards and farms. At the time of introduction, the invasive potential of B. terrestris and B. ruderatus was severely underestimated and large populations were released without much regulation. Over the past three decades, B. terrestris and B. ruderatus have had a negative effect on the propagation and survival of the native B. dahlbomii. The southward spread of these alien species at rates of up to 200 kilometers per year mirrors the simultaneous retraction and decline of B. dahlbomii populations.

=== Invasive species induced population decline ===
Although the population decline can be linked to the introduction of alien species, B. terrestris and B. ruderatus, the exact mechanisms that account for the decline in B. dahlbomii population are not completely understood. Research indicates that exploitative/competitive advantage and pathogen introduction account for some part of the population decline in Patagonia. The aliens’ competitive advantage results from their relatively high migration ability, foraging ranges, polylectic foraging strategies and gyne production rate when compared to B. dahlbomii. Moreover, B. dahlbomii queens emerge and colonize nests later in the season than their B. terrestris counterparts, which provides B. terrestris a colony-cycle advantage over B. dahlbomii and accounts for further decline.

=== Pathogen incidence ===
Populations of B. dahlbomii have been greatly affected by the highly pathogenic Apicystis bombi protozoan. A. bombi was co-introduced with the release of B. terrestris in certain South American regions. Research indicates that A. bombi did not exist in any South American regions prior to the introduction of commercial B. terrestris populations in Chile in the early 1980s. While A. bombi has little effect on the commercial B. terrestris that were introduced into South America, it does have a debilitating effect on B. dahlbomii. Upon introduction, A. bombi began infecting B. dahlbomii populations through pathogen spillover, which was facilitated by A. bombi’s lack of specificity (ability to infect a wide range of hosts- it affects over 20 bumblebee species in its native European habitats).

=== Pathogen mechanism and effect ===
B. dahlbomii individuals, both workers and queens, initially are infected by A. bombi when they ingest oocysts. Once ingested, the oocysts develop into sporozoites in B. dahlbomii intestines and eventually move to fat cells. The A. bombi life cycle negatively impacts B. dahlbomii populations through a couple of mechanisms. It starts by inhibiting colony formation by preventing worker/brood propagation. If active workers or queens exist, A. bombi leads to a plethora of physiological and behavioral effects that prevent essential actions such as foraging. Unfortunately, B. dahlbomii has very little ability to curtail the progression of this pathogenesis.

=== Batesian mimicry ===
Syrphid flies in Patagonia and the Southern parts of Chile (Aneriophora aureorufa) seem to use B. dahlbomii as a Batesian mimicry template. A. aureorufa thus, resembles/mimics certain aspects of B. dahlbomii morphology and behavior. In particular, B. dahlbomii and A. aureorufa have similar color and size, and are sometimes difficult to distinguish when observed in the wild because of similar flight motion patterns. The fact that such marked similarities exists illustrates how A. aureorufa morphology must have evolved rapidly, as B. dahlbomii speciation only occurred approximately 7.5 million years ago. The mimicry demonstrates how B. dahlbomii has a competitive advantage in avoiding predation that A. aureorufa lacks (A. aureorufa mimics B. dahlbomii to falsely “steal” this competitive advantage and increase fitness).

== Interaction with environment ==
=== Pollination ===
B. dahlbomii is an important pollinator to a number of plant species such as Lapageria rosea and Alstroemeria aurea in Chile and Patagonia. In certain ecosystems, specifically the Maulino forest area of Chile, B. dahlbomii plays an extremely important role in ensuring that fragmented plant populations get pollinated. Research indicates that individuals in such fragmented environments have longer wings relative to body size than those individuals that reside in continuous forest environments because they have a greater need for long range flights in such fragmented environments (long-winged individuals are favored). In general, B. dahlbomii has been shown to be a much more efficient pollinator than species of other tribes (Apis; Apini), families (Chalepogenus; Anthoporidea) and orders. Although B. dahlbomii has also been shown to be a more efficient pollinator than the invasive B. ruderatus, B. dahlbomii visits plants less frequently than its invasive counterpart.

== Current events ==
B. dahlbomii is now in danger of extinction. In 2014, The Independent reported that this species is endangered by the arrival of the two invasive species detailed above. Researchers are worried that further imports of European species to South American countries could lead to complete destruction of native species within the next couple of years. This bee is an endangered species on the IUCN Red List.
