= Menzbieria =

Scientific classification
- Domain: Eukaryota
- Clade: Sar
- Superphylum: Alveolata
- Phylum: Apicomplexa
- Class: Conoidasida
- Order: Neogregarinorida
- Family: Lipotrophidae
- Genus: Menzbieria; Bogoyavlensky, 1922

Species
- Menzbieria adelae Menzbieria chalcographi Menzbieria hydrachnae

Genus of single-celled organisms

Menzbieria is a genus of parasitic alveolates of the phylum Apicomplexa.

Species in this genus infect insects (Coleoptera and Lepidoptera).

== Taxonomy ==
This genus was described by Bogoyavlensky in 1922.

The type species is Menzbieria hydrachnae.

== Description ==
Species of this genus have only rarely been reported.

The protozoa are spread by the orofaecal route.

The trophozoites are found in the fat body, gut and Malphigian tubes.

The schizonts may be intra or extra cellular.

Two types of merogony may occur and this may occur in the lumen of the gut or extraluminally.

The gametes are spherical and of similar size (isogamy) and bud from the surface of the gamont.

The oocysts are of the actinocephalid type (lemon shaped).

There may be 16 or 32 sporocysts per oocyst.

== Host records ==
- Menzbieria adelae - green longhorn butterfly (Adela reaumurella)
- Menzbieria chalcographi - great spruce bark beetle (Dendroctonus micans)
- Menzbieria hydrachnae - Hydrachna species
