= Lipotropha =

Scientific classification
- Domain: Eukaryota
- Clade: Sar
- Clade: Alveolata
- Phylum: Apicomplexa
- Class: Conoidasida
- Order: Neogregarinorida
- Family: Lipotrophidae
- Genus: Lipotropha; Keilin, 1923

Species
- Lipotropha caliphorae Lipotropha dorci Lipotropha microspora Lipotropha milloti Lipotropha macrospora

Genus of flies

Lipotropha is a genus of parasitic alveolates of the phylum Apicomplexa.

Species in this genus infect insects and myriapods.

== Taxonomy ==
This genus was created by David Keilin in 1923.

The type species is Lipotropha macrospora.

== Description ==
The schizogonic and sporogomic stages are intracellular.

The oocyst contains sixteen spores.

Each spore has eight sporozoites.

== Host records ==
Parasites in this genus infect Systenus species.
