= Farinocystis =

Scientific classification
- Domain: Eukaryota
- Clade: Sar
- Superphylum: Alveolata
- Phylum: Apicomplexa
- Class: Conoidasida
- Order: Neogregarinorida
- Family: Lipotrophidae
- Genus: Farinocystis; Weiser, 1953

Species
- Farinocystis tribolii

Genus of single-celled organisms

Farinocystis is a genus of parasitic alveolates of the phylum Apicomplexa. Species in this genus infect insects (Coleoptera).

== Taxonomy ==
This genus was described by Weiser in 1953.

The type species is Farinocystis tribolii.

== Host records ==
- Mealworm (Tenebrio molitor)
