= Copihue Airport =

- IATA: none; ICAO: SCHP

Summary
- Airport type: Private
- Serves: Retiro, Chile
- Elevation AMSL: 551 ft / 168 m
- Coordinates: 36°4′40″S 71°46′50″W

Map
- Location of Copihue Airport in Chile

Runways
Direction	Length		Surface
Direction	m	ft	Surface
03/21	900	2,953	Grass
- Source: Landings.com Google Maps GCM

Retiro Copihue Airport (Spanish: Aeropuerto Copihue, (ICAO: SCHP)) is an airport 2 kilometres (1.2 mi) south of Retiro, near the village of Copihue in the Maule Region of Chile.

== See also ==
- Transport in Chile
- List of airports in Chile
