= Aneriophora =

Scientific classification
- Kingdom: Animalia
- Phylum: Arthropoda
- Class: Insecta
- Order: Diptera
- Family: Syrphidae
- Tribe: Milesiini
- Genus: Aneriophora; Stuardo & Cortes, 1952
- Species: A. aureorufa

Binomial name
- Aneriophora aureorufa (Philippi, 1865)

Synonyms
- Genus: Eriophora Philippi, 1865; Species: Eriophora aureorufa Philippi, 1865

Genus of flies

Aneriophora is a little-known genus of hoverflies from South America. It contains only one species, Aneriophora aureorufa. The genus was originally named Eriophora by Rodolfo Amando Philippi (1865); this name was preoccupied by Eriophora Simon, 1864, so it was renamed to Aneriophora by Stuardo and Cortés (1952). This species is a specialist pollinator of Eucryphia cordifolia and Laurelia sempervirens.
