= Lipotrophidae =

Scientific classification
- Domain: Eukaryota
- Clade: Sar
- Superphylum: Alveolata
- Phylum: Apicomplexa
- Class: Conoidasida
- Order: Neogregarinorida
- Family: Lipotrophidae; Grassé, 1953

Genera
- Apicystis; Farinocystis; Lipocystis; Lipotropha; Mattesia; Menzbieria

Family of single-celled organisms

The Lipotrophidae are a family of parasitic alveolates in the phylum Apicomplexa. Species in this family infect insects (Diptera, Lepidoptera, Coleoptera and Hymenoptera).

== History ==
This family was described by Grasse in 1953.

== Taxonomy ==
Six genera are currently recognised in this family.

== Lifecycle ==
Merogony generally occurs by budding from surface of meront to form uniformly sized merozoites. The gametes are similar (isogametes) and fuse to form navicular oocysts which have pronounced polar thickenings. The oocysts contain eight (rarely four) sporozoites.
