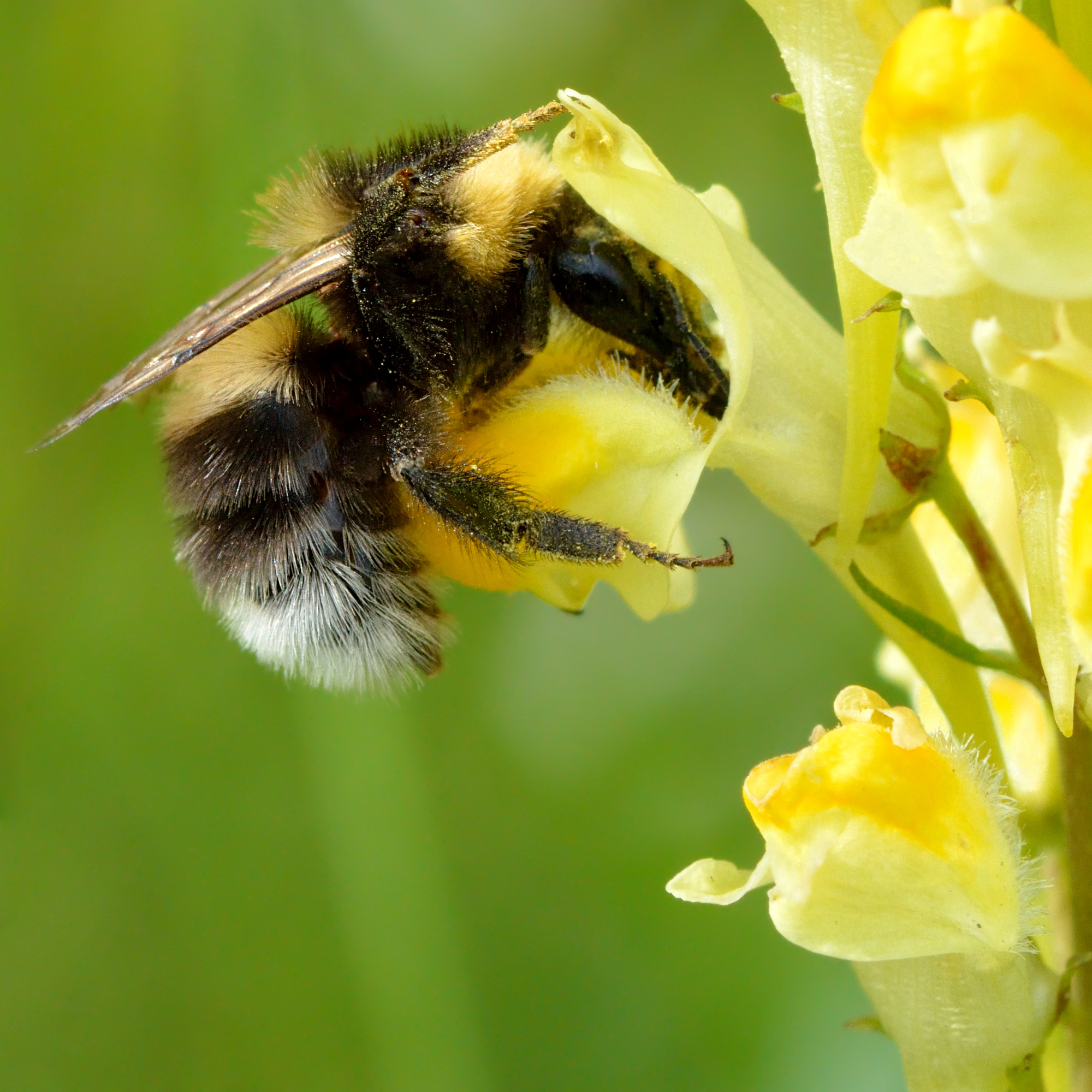

Scientific classification
- Kingdom: Animalia
- Phylum: Arthropoda
- Clade: Pancrustacea
- Class: Insecta
- Order: Hymenoptera
- Family: Apidae
- Genus: Bombus
- Subgenus: Bombus (Megabombus)
- Species: B. hortorum

Binomial name
- Bombus hortorum (Linnaeus, 1761)

= Bombus hortorum =

Species of bee

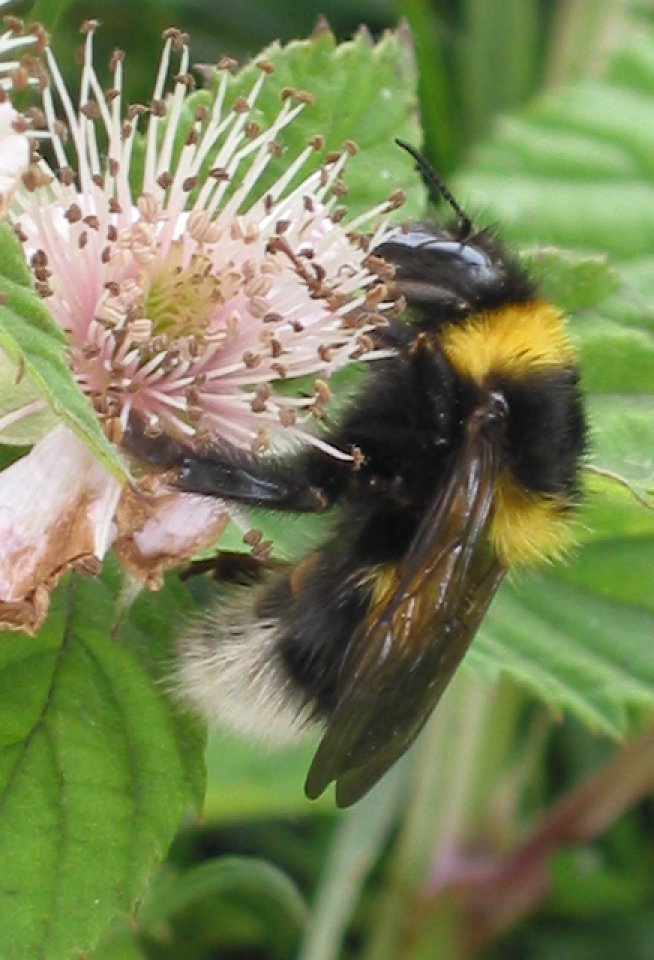
Queen on blackberry flower

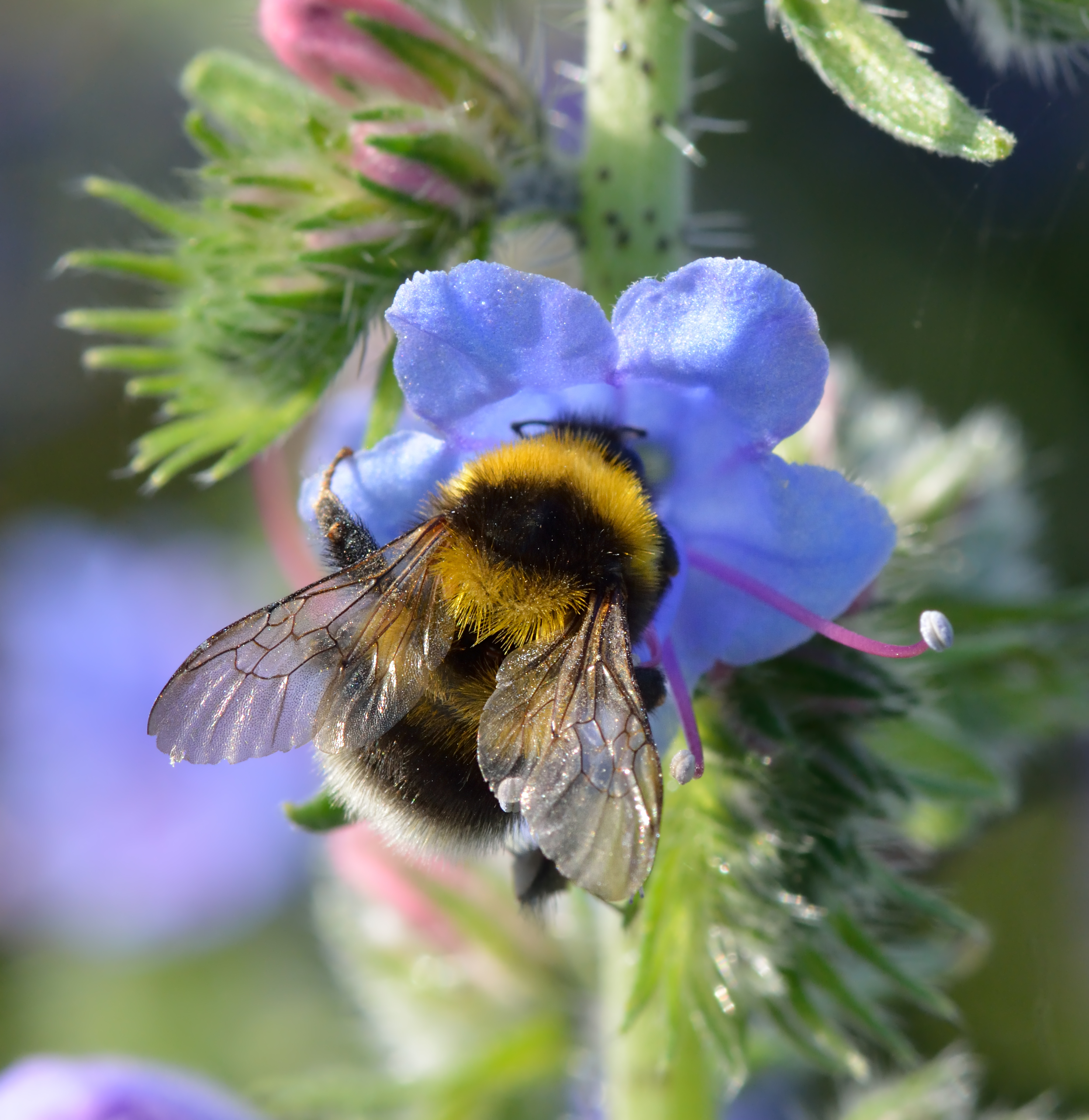
Queen on flower of Echium vulgare (Viper's Bugloss or Blueweed)

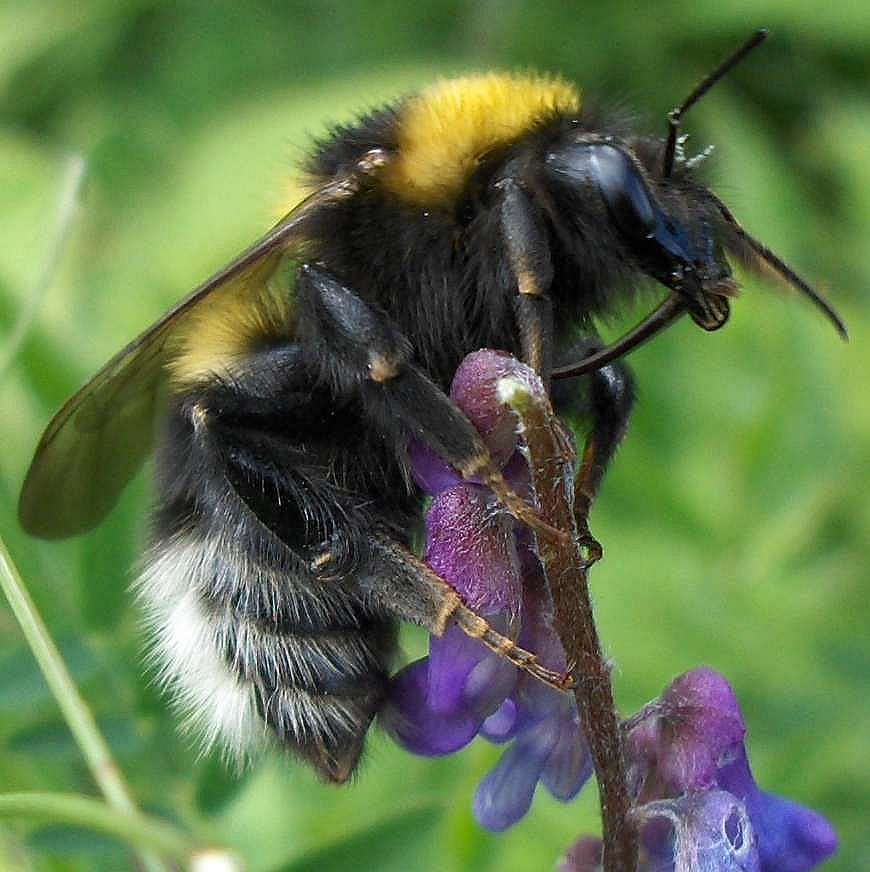
Queen on Linaria purpurea (Purple Toadflax)

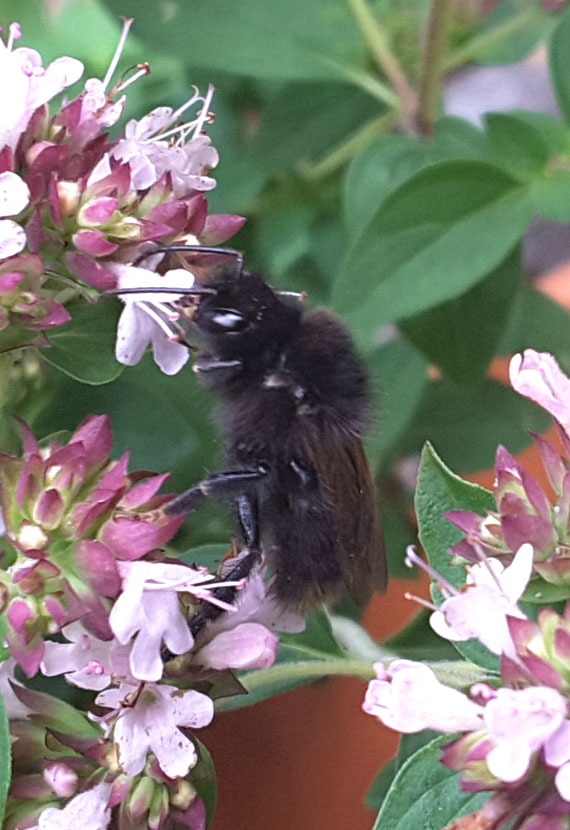
Melanistic (all-black) garden bumblebee on oregano

Bombus hortorum, the garden bumblebee or small garden bumblebee, is a species of bumblebee found in most of Europe north to 70°N, as well as parts of Asia and New Zealand. It is distinguished from most other bumblebees by its long tongue used for feeding on pollen in deep-flowered plants. Accordingly, this bumblebee mainly visits flowers with deep corollae, such as deadnettles, ground ivy, vetches, clovers, comfrey, foxglove, and thistles. They have a good visual memory, which aids them in navigating the territory close to their habitat and seeking out food sources.

== Taxonomy and phylogeny ==
Bombus hortorum belongs to the Bombus, or bumblebee, genus. It is one of the six most common bumblebees throughout Europe. Of the five commonest species, only two are long-tongued: B. hortorum and B. pascuorum.

Its close relative Bombus ruderatus also has a long tongue, but is much less common. Bombus hortorum and Bombus ruderatus are nearly identical in appearance, but DNA sequence data distinguishes them as clearly-separate species.

== Description ==
This bumblebee has an oblong head and a very long tongue, about 15 mm (0.59 in), and in some cases even 20 mm (0.79 in). The tongue is so long that the bee often flies with it extended when collecting nectar. The queen is variable in size, with body lengths between 19 and 22 mm (0.75 and 0.87 in), and wing spans from 35 to 38 mm (1.4 to 1.5 in). The workers are almost as large, the larger ones overlapping the smaller queens. Their color is black with a yellow collar, a narrow yellow band on the scutellum, and a third yellow band on terga (abdominal segments) 1 and 2. The tail is white. Darker forms, with little yellow in their fur, are common.

=== Eye anatomy and vision ===
The compound eyes of Bombus hortorum are two dark, oval structures situated on the dorsal-ventral axis of their head. They lack interfacetal hairs and feature a relatively thick cornea and large retinal cells. Three types of spectrally sensitive cells were identified: UV with peak sensitivity to light of 353 nm wavelength, blue and green sensitive receptors with peak sensitivities to wavelengths of 430 nm and 548 nm, respectively. The ratios of these three cell types were 1:1:6. Polarization sensitivity occurred mostly in the UV cell types. The median ocellus was found to possess a much wider acceptance angle and a higher UV : green receptor cell ratio than the compound eye.

== Distribution and habitat ==
This species is found in Europe as far north as 70ºN (in Scandinavia, south of the tundra). In the west, its distribution reaches Iceland, where it probably has been introduced. In the south, it extends to the middle of the Iberian Peninsula, to southern Italy (Calabria), northern Turkey, and to the Mediterranean islands except Corsica, Sicily, and (probably) Sardinia. It continues in northern and central Asia through Siberia to the Altai Mountains, and, in the southeast, to northern Iran. In 1885, it was introduced in New Zealand, where it still exists, but without being particularly common. It is also found in America, particularly Florida. It is found throughout the British Isles, including Orkney and Shetland. Bombus hortorum are commonly found in grassland environments with abundant flowers that they can feed on.

In a study analyzing spatial patterns of Bombus in different habitats, it was discovered that B. hortorum are most abundant in recently cattle-grazed grasslands, as compared to arable, sheep-grazed, unmanaged, and disturbed land plots. Cattle play an important role in the habitat of Bombus species because their feeding actions in grasslands cause a more diverse floral environment, which is preferred by the bumblebees for their own foraging behavior.

Due to their localized lifestyle and the destruction and loss of grassland habitats, Bombus hortorum populations are expected to decline in the future. In order to address the conservation of Bombus hortorum, it is important that large areas of foraging plant diversity and nesting sites either receive no intervention as to foster a natural habitat, or are extensively grazed by cattle during the summer in order to promote plant diversity and create an environment rich in favored flowers for Bombus.

=== Nests ===
Bombus hortorum queens searching for locations to build a nest are most frequently found along forest and field boundaries and in open uncultivated fields. B. hortorum usually build their nests under the ground. They need moss and dried grass to be present in their habitats in order to successfully build their homes. Thus, they prefer grassland habitats with ample sunlight reaching the land in order to ensure secure and warm nests beneath the ground. Both this species and Bombus pratorum are known to build their nests in unusual places.

== Colony cycle ==
=== Colony growth ===
A single queen starts a new colony in the springtime. B. hortorum is usually the last of the common Bombus species in Europe to emerge after hibernation. The queens carry out all necessary duties by themselves for over a month until the first batch of workers develops from larvae. In late summer and early fall, new breeding females and males emerge. The males do not return to the nest after they have developed. Instead, they care for themselves independently. The colony size of Bombus hortorum is small compared to other bumblebee colonies. A large bumblebee colony is considered to be several hundred individuals. The typical season of bumblebees lasts from mid-March to October, with summer showing the largest population size.

=== Colony decline ===
At the end of the species' season in the winter, mated queens search for hibernation sites underground while the rest of the colony dies off.

The modernization of agriculture and demand for crops to feed the human population has brought about a significant increase in pesticide use. This has an adverse effect on the genus Bombus. Pesticides can impact the B. hortorum colonies by reducing brood development and also negatively impacting their memory, preventing them from remembering the locations of their foraging sites and nests. When a single queen first establishes her colony at the beginning of the season, pesticide risks could pose consequences for colony development and size, therefore resulting in colony decline. However, this species overall is not in danger of extinction, despite this use of pesticides.

== Behavior ==
=== Communication ===
Bombus hortorum do not readily communicate with others when foraging. Instead, they collect food independently using a method called 'trap-lining', in which individuals follow a regular route and visit the same flowers each time they forage.

=== Mating behavior ===
Bombus hortorum females mate once only; this increases the overall relatedness of individuals in their colony. At the end of the season in late summer, females mate and then store the sperm in spermatheca during their hibernation period. Then, at the start of the season when the queen emerges to start her colony, she uses the stored sperm to fertilize her eggs and produce workers. The average ejaculate size in B. hortorum is 6,800 sperm, which is relatively small compared to other Bombus species. As with most bumblebees, the males of this species patrol a fixed circuit, marking objects along the route, about a meter above ground, with a pheromone to attract queens. This behaviour was noted by Darwin 1886 in his own garden.

=== Foraging behavior ===
Bombus hortorum have been found to forage on plants in the genus Aquilegia; specifically the species A. vulgaris in Belgium and A. chrysantha in North America and Belgium. In regards to Aquilegia foraging, Bombus hortorum do not show any preference in color of the flowers.

When Bombus workers set out to forage, they typically restrict themselves to either pollen collection or nectar foraging on one specific plant species. On the other hand, queens combine both pollen and nectar foraging in one expedition and visit multiple plant species. The queens use their tongue and jaws to grasp the stamen and petals of the flowers and collect food. While several other Bombus species perforate the flowers when foraging, Bombus hortorum do not perforate the flowers they feed on. This lack of perforation is thought to be attributed to the species' extremely long tongue length, which sufficiently reaches the nectar without any trouble.

Bombus individuals forage in small areas of several square meters for many days. Small areas they have been found to feed in are commonly separated by brush from neighboring spaces. In a study examining diet preferences of Bombus hortorum, it was determined that foraging behavior of individual bumblebees affects isolation and hybridization of flowering plants. In comparing choices of Rhinanthus plant species, B. hortorum queens and workers showed a strong preference for R. serotinus which has a long corolla length, but it easily reached with B. hortorum's long tongue length. Observations of B. hortorum foraging patterns reveal that they are nototribic, or upright pollinators. Thus, when feeding, pollen is deposited on their head and thorax rather than on their legs and the underside of their abdomen as seen in sternotribic, or inverted foragers. When feeding on plants in quick continuation, bumblebees have their proboscis extended as they approach the flower. Data from this study reveals that when pollinating, Bombus hortorum visit eighteen flowers per minute, which is more than other species. This large quantity is most likely due to the greater efficiency B. hortorum experience by having longer tongues. B. hortorum play a prominent role in causing cross-pollination in Rhinanthus flowers and thus, make hybridization possible.

=== Red clover ===
The majority of the pollen they collect comes from the flowers of plants of the Fabaceae family. Bombus hortorum are especially fond of one species of Fabaceae, red clover, Trifolium pratense. The preference for Trifolium pratense is related to the very long tongue of B. hortorum. Because T. pratense is a flower species with a long corolla tube depth, B. hortorum can easily reach the nectar and pollen within the tube.

Bumblebees tend to favor perennial flowers, which tend to produce more nectar than annual species.

B. hortorum compete for nectar with honeybees, which bite holes in the flowers of red clover so that their short tongues can reach the nectar. Because B. hortorum has better visual sensitivity compared to other bees, they can start foraging earlier in the morning and return to their nests later in the day. Direct competition is thus avoided; bumblebees forage early in the morning and evening while honeybees forage during the afternoon.

B. hortorum exhibit buzz pollination, a foraging behavior in which they generate vibrations that are transmitted onto the anthers of flowers, thus ejecting the pollen that they gather and then consume. In a study comparing other Bombus species, B. hortorum was found to create higher buzz amplitudes, thus making more efficient at collecting pollen.

==== Traplining ====
B. hortorum exhibit traplining, a foraging behavior in which they visit the same feeding areas using regular routes that they repeat over several days. The routes are unique to individual bees. Using their preferred routes, Bombus individuals move between plant groups and forage patches as they search for pollen and nectar to consume. The flight direction among these routes is often irreversible, unless environmental factors like wind interfere.

=== Movement behavior ===
B. hortorum have been found to fly distances up to 1.3 kilometers in a relatively short period of time, approximately one to four days. Queens in particular travel long distances in dispersal flights; this increases gene flow within the species. When traveling longer distances, bumblebees occasionally stop to rest, often resting on prominent structures in their landscape, such as trees.

=== Unusual behavior due to transmitter attachment ===
In a study assessing the movement behavior and flight distances of Bombus hortorum, radio tracking was used as a method to gather data on the bee's routes. To carry out this research, transmitters were attached to the bumblebee's bodies, directly on their abdomen. The bees took unusually long periods of rest and cleaning in the middle of their flight - one individual took breaks longer than forty-five minutes - in response to the extra weight and disturbance.

=== Defense ===
B. hortorum use defensive buzzes as warning signs and to show aggression. They are louder, produced with much more power than other buzzes.

=== Parasites ===
==== Neogregarine parasite ====
In 1988, a new pathogen was discovered to be affecting B. hortorum workers and queens, causing the appearance of unusual spores on the bumblebees. Research confirmed that a new parasitic protozoan that belongs to the order Neogregarinida caused the infection; this was attributed to the type of spores and the life cycle associated with the protozoan. It is presumed that the parasite is widely distributed throughout Europe.

==== Crithidia bombi ====
Bombus hortorum serve as hosts for Crithidia bombi, a widespread gut parasite that is present in many bumblebee species. The pathogens negatively impact reproductive fitness of Bombus queens, as they affect their ovarian development as well as early colony establishment after the queens emerge from hibernation. Queens hibernating underground during the winter are not directly affected by the parasite. C. bombi's dominant route of infection into Bombus individuals is by ingestion of the infectious agents by larvae from the workers that feed them. This process is known as vertical transmission and is greatly influenced by the number of available individuals who can serve as potential vectors. Horizontal transmission also occurs, in which foraging worker bees catch infections left on flowers by other bees. While inside their host bodies, Crithidia bombi have been discovered to reproduce clonally as well as sexually. After being ingested, the genotype of the host can play a prominent role in the development of the parasite. Bumblebee colonies that exhibit little variety in their gene pool, as a result of inbreeding, tend to have a higher occurrence of C. bombi as compared to Bombus populations with high levels of heterozygosity. Furthermore, the host genotype may affect the response to the parasite by triggering the bee's innate immune system, up-regulated effector genes that defend the host.

== Human importance ==
Bombus hortorum are frequent pollinators of many crops, including sunflowers, strawberries, apples, and tomatoes.

The modernization of agriculture and demand for crops to feed the human population has brought about a significant increase in pesticide use. This has an adverse effect on the genus Bombus. The bees are directly exposed to the chemicals in two ways: by consuming nectar that has been directly treated with pesticide, or through physical contact with treated plants and flowers. Pesticides can impact the B. hortorum colonies by reducing brood development and also impairs their memory, preventing them from remembering the locations of their foraging sites and nests. Furthermore, when a single queen is first establishing her colony at the beginning of the season, pesticide risks could pose consequences for colony development and size.
