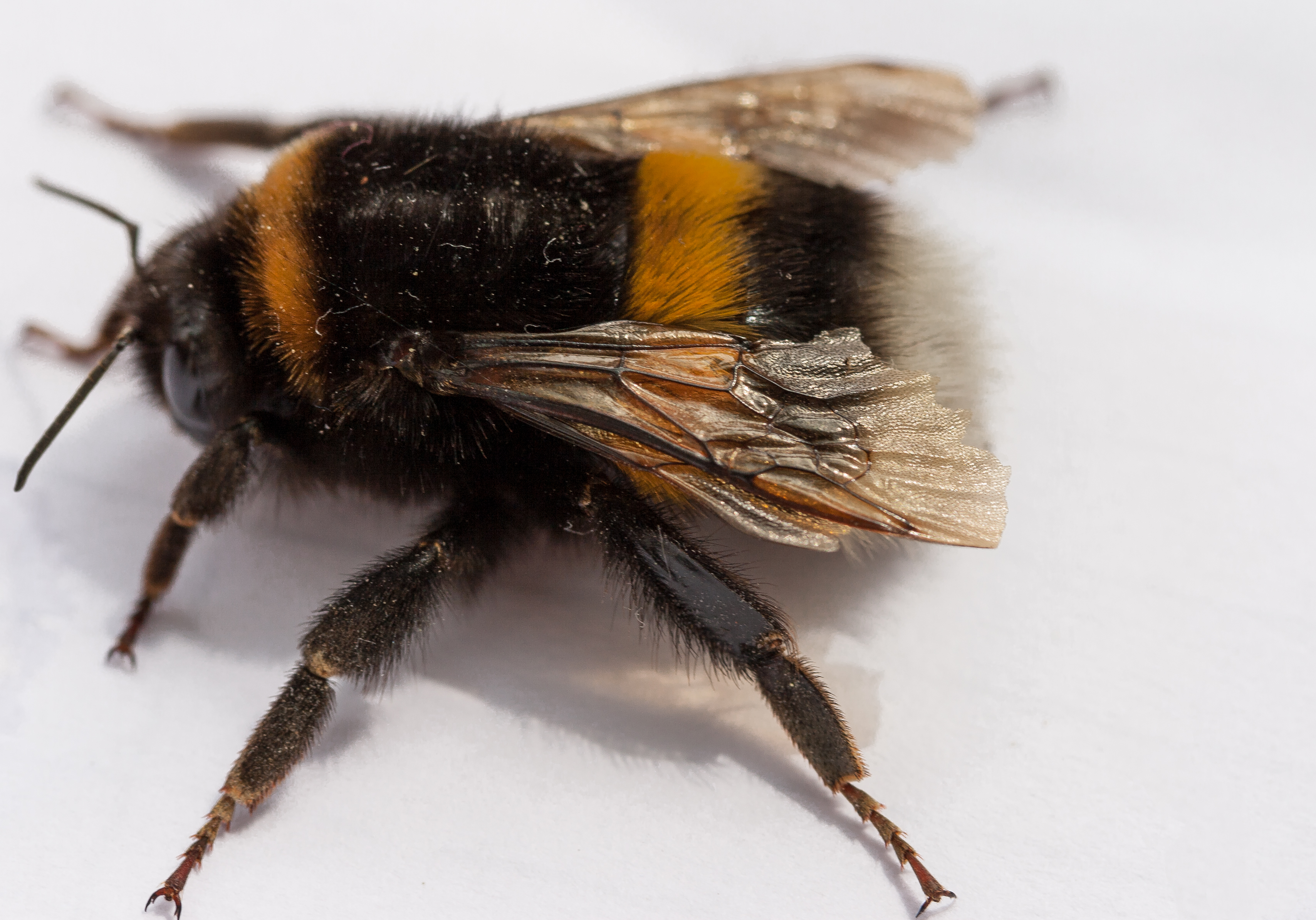

Conservation status
- Least Concern (IUCN 3.1)

Scientific classification
- Kingdom: Animalia
- Phylum: Arthropoda
- Clade: Pancrustacea
- Class: Insecta
- Order: Hymenoptera
- Family: Apidae
- Genus: Bombus
- Subgenus: Bombus
- Species: B. terrestris

Binomial name
- Bombus terrestris (Linnaeus, 1758)

Synonyms
- B. africanus Vogt in Krüger, 1956; B. audax (Harris, 1776); B. canariensis Pérez, 1895; B. dalmatinus Dalla Torre, 1882; B. lusitanicus Krüger, 1956; B. maderensis Krüger, 1956; B. terrestriformis Erlandsson, 1979; B. xanthopus Kriechbaumer, 1870

= Bombus terrestris =

Species of bee

Bombus terrestris, the buff-tailed bumblebee or large earth bumblebee, is one of the most numerous bumblebee species in Europe. It is one of the main species used in greenhouse pollination, and so can be found in many countries and areas where it is not native, such as Tasmania. Moreover, it is a eusocial insect with an overlap of generations, a division of labour, and cooperative brood care. The queen is monogamous, which means she mates with only one male. B. terrestris workers learn flower colours and forage efficiently.

== Taxonomy and phylogenetics ==
B. terrestris is part of the order Hymenoptera, which is composed of ants, bees, and wasps. The family Apidae specifically consists of bees. It is also part of the subfamily Apinae. There are 14 tribe lineages within Apinae, and B. terrestris is in the bumblebee tribe, Bombini. It is in the genus Bombus, which consists entirely of bumblebees, and the subgenus Bombus sensu stricto. This subgenus contains closely related species such as Bombus affinis, Bombus cryptarum, Bombus franklini, Bombus ignitus, Bombus lucorum, Bombus magnus, Bombus occidentalis, and Bombus terricola. There are nine recognized subspecies: B. terrestris africanus, B. terrestris audax, B. terrestris calabricus, B. terrestris canariensis, B. terrestris dalmatinus, B. terrestris lusitanicus, B. terrestris sassaricus, B. terrestris terrestris and B. terrestris xanthopus, each with a distinctive coloration scheme.

== Description and identification ==
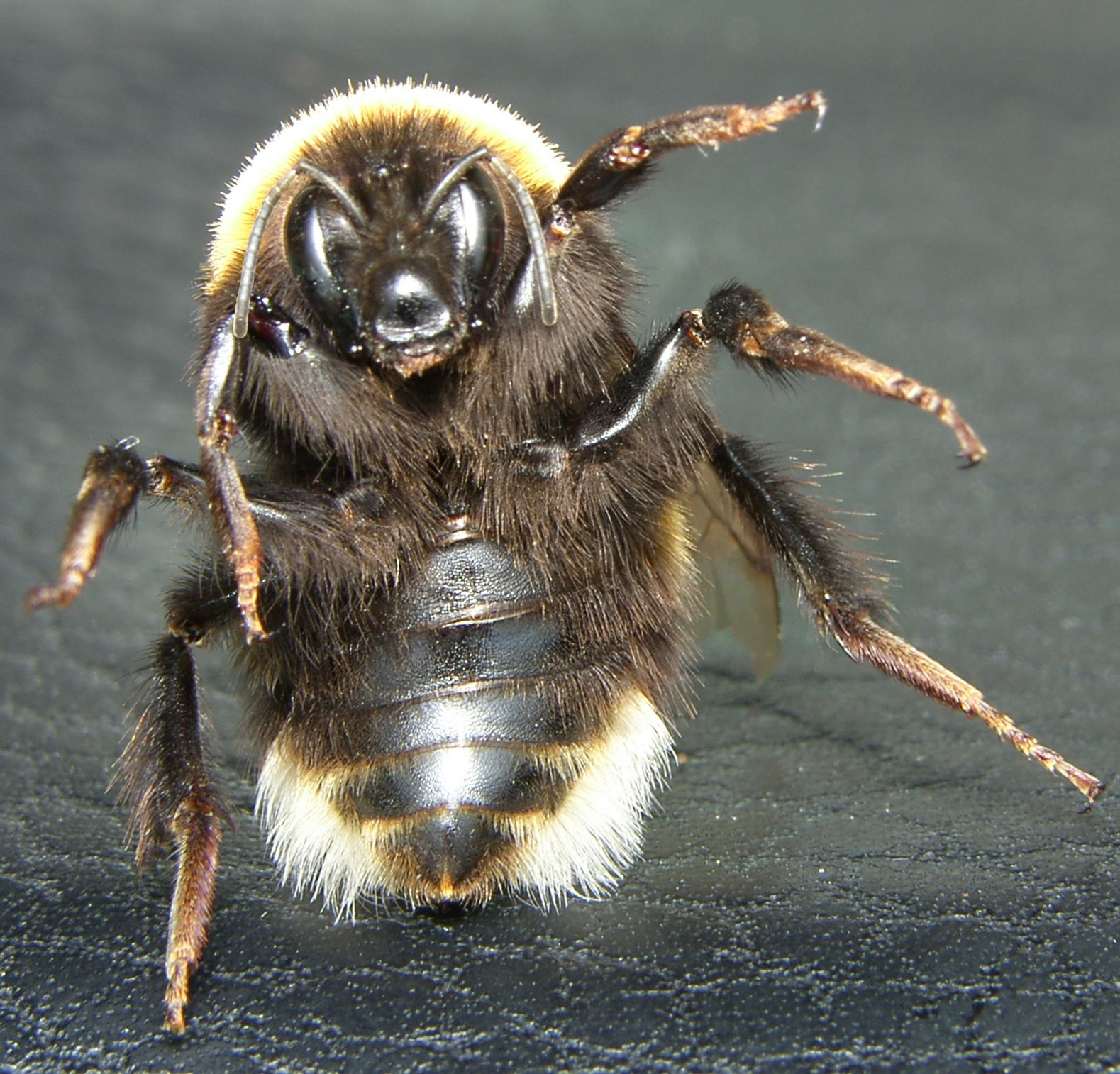
Ventral view of B. terrestris

B. terrestris are pollen-storing bees that generally feed and forage on nectar and pollen. The queen is between 20 and 22 mm long, males range from 14 to 16 mm, and workers from 11 to 17 mm. Workers have white-ended abdomens, and look just like workers of the white-tailed bumblebee, B. lucorum, a close relative, apart from the yellowish bands of B. terrestris being darker in direct comparison. The queens of B. terrestris have the namesake buff-white abdomen tip ("tail"); this area is white as in the workers in B. lucorum. B. terrestris is unique compared to other bees in that their caste of workers exhibit a wide variation in worker size, with thorax sizes ranging from 2.3 to 6.9 mm in length and masses ranging from 68 to 754 mg.

== Distribution and habitat ==
B. terrestris is most commonly found throughout Europe and generally occupies temperate climates. Because it can survive in a wide variety of habitats, there are populations in the Near East, the Mediterranean Islands, and Northern Africa as well. Additionally, it has escaped captivity after being introduced as a greenhouse pollinator in countries where it is not native, so this bee is now considered an invasive species in many of these places, including Japan, Chile, Argentina, and Tasmania. Nests are usually found underground, such as in abandoned rodent dens. Colonies form comb-like nest structures with egg cells each containing several eggs. The queen will lay egg cells on top of one another. Colonies produce between 300 and 400 bees on average, with a large variation in the number of workers.

== Colony structure ==
=== Social castes ===
Like in most social bees, there are three main social caste divisions in B. terrestris. This ensures a division of labor and efficient colony functioning. Queens become the main female individual to reproduce in a future colony. There is only one per colony. Her sole responsibility is to lay eggs after she founds a nest. This fate is determined for larvae that receive more food, have longer instar stages, and higher levels of juvenile hormone biosynthesis. Workers, an entirely female caste, mainly forage for food, defend the colony, and tend to the growing larvae. They are usually sterile for most of the colony cycle and do not raise their own young. Unlike queens and workers, which develop from fertilized diploid eggs, drones, or male bees, are born from unfertilized, haploid eggs. Drones leave the colony shortly after reaching adulthood to find a mate outside the nest. Mating is their sole role in the colony.

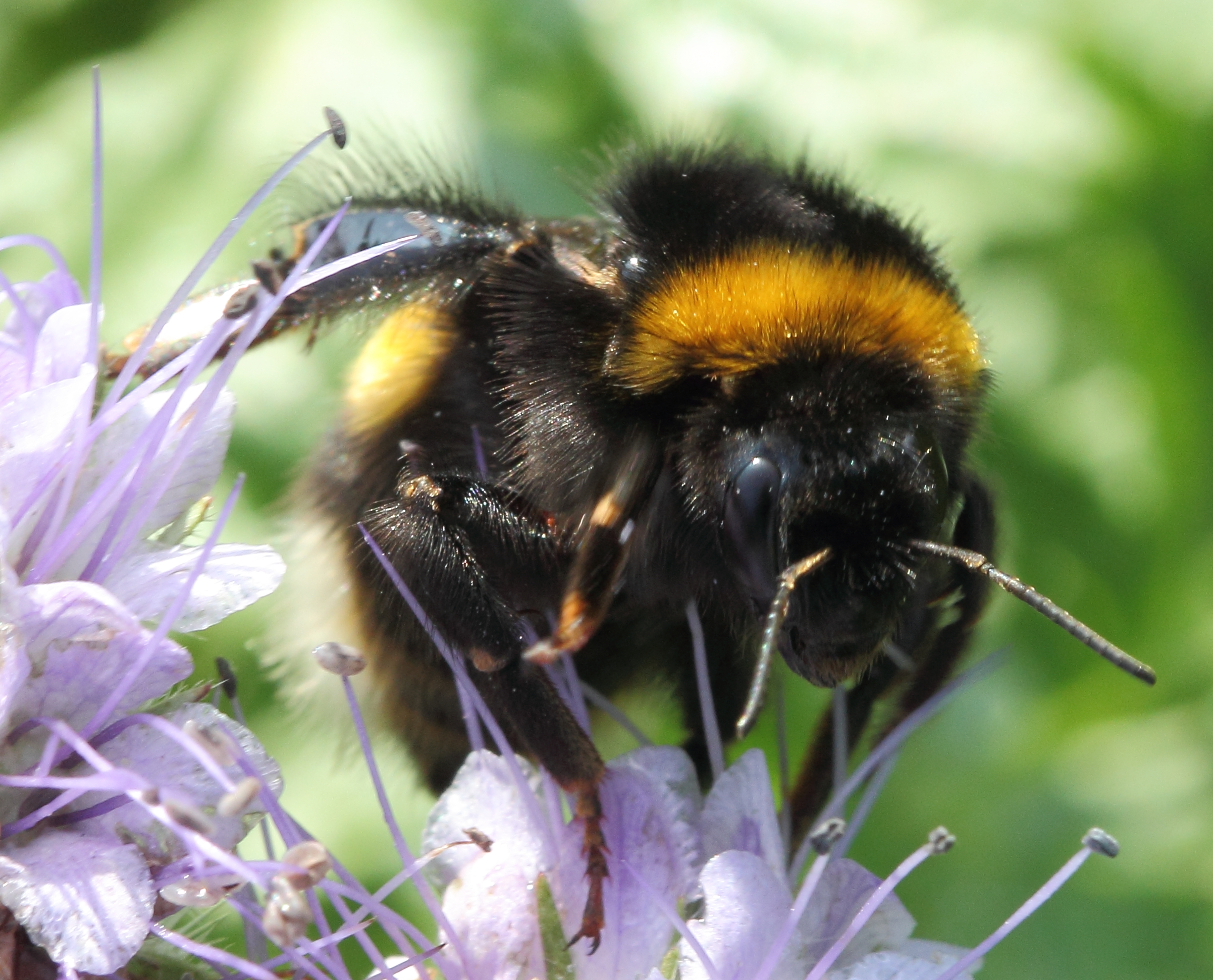
B. terrestris queen

=== Life cycle ===
A solitary queen hatched from her abandoned colony initiates the colony cycle when she mates with a male and finds a nest. She will stay in this nest over winter and then will lay a small batch of diploid (female) eggs in the spring. Once these hatch, she tends the larvae, feeding them with nectar and pollen. When the larvae are grown, they pupate, and about two weeks later, the first workers emerge. This is known as the initiation phase of the colony. Workers forage for nectar and pollen for the colony and tend later generations of larvae. The workers are smaller than the queen, and usually die while foraging in the jaws of predators like birds or robberflies. The foraging range and frequency of workers depends on the quality and distribution of available food, but most workers forage within a few hundred meters of their nest.

This first phase can last a variable amount of time in B. terrestris, after which a switch point is reached, and the queen begins to lay some unfertilized eggs, which develop into males. When the male drones emerge from the nest, they do not return, foraging only for themselves. They seek out emerging queens and mate with them. The remaining diploid eggs hatch into larvae that receive extra food and pupate to become new queens. The queen can use pheromones to discourage the workers' inclination to invest more in these larvae, thereby ensuring that not too many become queens. The resolution of this worker/queen conflict can be complex and is discussed below. The colony persists until fall in temperate zones and then workers begin to lay unfertilized eggs that if they mature will become males. At this point, outright aggression among workers and between the queen and workers begins. This is a predictable time point that occurs about 30 days into the colony cycle in very temperate climates.

Usually, the worker–queen conflict will force the queen out and the new workers will become queenless. A "false queen" might take control of the colony for a short period. The newly emerged queens sometimes act as workers and help to raise another brood of queens. During this time they daily leave the nest looking for food, during which time they may mate. Eventually they find a site to dig a "hibernaculum" where they will hibernate until the next spring, when they emerge, seek food — primarily to build up their ovaries — and soon seek a site to found a new nest. (In warmer climates they may skip the hibernation stage.) Almost always the old colony will have died out, and if the site is free of parasites one of the new queens will return and reuse that site.

== Reproductive behavior ==
B. terrestris is a singly mating species. Mating with multiple males might provide benefits of genetic variability among the brood, but it does not happen in this or any but the most highly derived social bees. The lack of multiple matings by B. terrestris queens may be partly due to male interference. B. terrestris males plug the female's sexual tract with a sticky secretion during mating, which appears to reduce the female's ability to successfully mate with other males for several days. However honeybee males also plug the female's reproductive tract to no avail; honeybees mate tens of times on one mating flight. While there may be genetic fitness benefits in colony heterogeneity from a polyandrous mating system, bumblebees are also likely to be monandrous due to social constraints, risks associated with multiple matings, and phylogenetic inertia since the ancestral bees are singly mated. Finding multiple mates might be energetically costly and expose the queen to higher predation risks. Additionally, while queens may prefer multiple matings to ensure more genetic variability and viable offspring, workers are more closely related to full sisters than to paternal half sisters. This is due to haplodiploidy in Hymenopteran social insects in which males (drones) are haploid and females (workers and queens) are diploid. This confers greater genetic similarity between sister workers (relatedness of 0.75) than between mother and offspring (relatedness of 0.5), making the relatedness component of kin selection higher between sisters.

In addition to the queen, the workers can lay eggs. Since workers do not mate, all of their eggs are haploid and will develop into drones. There are multiple factors that determine whether a worker bee will become reproductively active. Workers born early in the first brood are more likely to become egg layers due to their increased size and age, which allows more time for ovarian development. Workers usually have to be at least 30 days old to become an egg layer. Individuals that spend less time foraging and more time near the queen are also more likely to become reproductive. Lastly, due to intense competition for the opportunity to reproduce, older workers often harass the queen by attacking her and buzzing loudly. Once this point is reached the colony is usually abandoned.

Due to the variability in the switch point to male production from worker production of B. terrestris colonies, there are varying levels of sex ratios among nests. Early-switching colonies have a much smaller number of future queens compared to males (1:17.4), which may give them a competitive advantage in mating with later emerging queens. Late-switching colonies have fewer males and a more even sex ratio of 1:1:3, thus indicating the queen's control over her colony (she prefers a 1:1 ratio, since she is equally related to both sons and daughters). On the other hand, workers prefer a 3:1 ratio, as they are more related to each other than to their mother. Although early and late switching colonies are usually balanced equally in numbers in the population, the overall demographic in one study was found to be male biased, resulting in an overall sex ratio of 1:4 (female to males). However, most studies show that this balance of bimodal sex determination between early and late-switching colonies creates the queen's preferred 1:1 sex ratio in B. terrestris populations. This is unusual for monogamous social insects, which usually have a 3:1 sex ratio indicative of worker colony control. B. terrestris often does not conform to standard predictions of sex ratios based on evolutionary theory and haplodiploid theory.

=== Reproductive suppression ===
Queen bees can control oogenesis in worker bees by suppressing juvenile hormone (JH) in the workers, which regulates egg development. Among queenless B. terrestris workers, the corpora allata, which secrete JH, was noticeably enlarged compared to queenright workers. JH concentrations were also higher in the hemolymph of queenless workers. This suggests that the presence of a queen is enough to prevent workers from laying eggs, which helps her maintain genetic control over her colony's brood. The mechanism through which the queen induces this behavior is likely through pheromones.

While the queen controls much of the egg laying and larval development in the colony, it is likely that workers play a much bigger role in controlling egg laying than previously thought. Dominant workers will often inhibit younger workers from laying eggs. Workers have low levels of JH and ovarian development during the early stages of the colony cycle and also after the competition point. Workers introduced into queenright and queenless colonies experience similar levels of inhibition from fellow workers during the competition point, indicating the key role of worker policing of fellow nest mates later in the colony cycle. This suggests that worker reproductive development will be highest between early development and the competition point in the colony.

== Kin selection ==
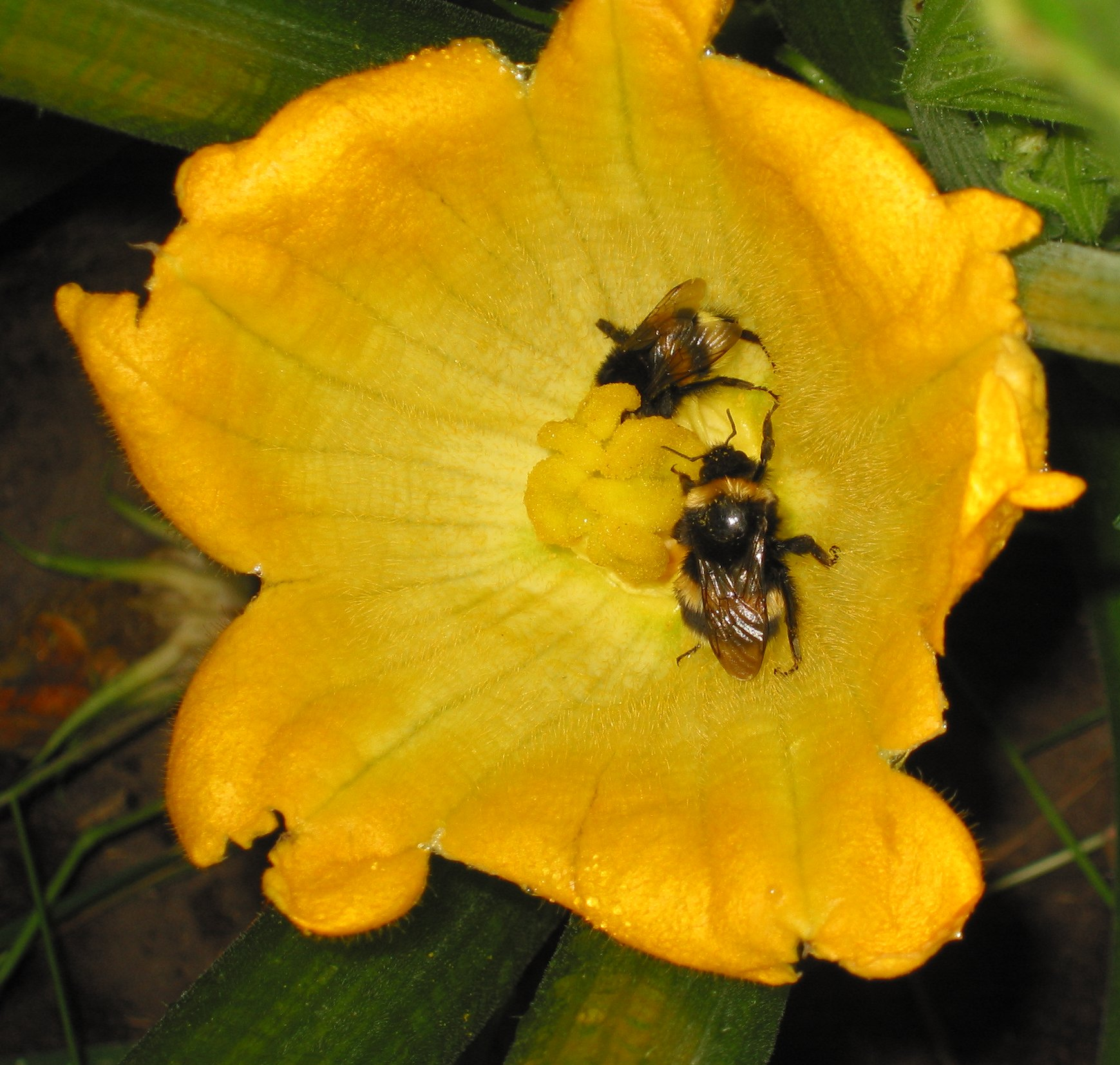
Queen and worker on Cucurbita pepo flower

=== Worker–queen conflict ===
Conflict is expected between the queen and workers over the sex ratio and reproduction of males in the colony, especially in monandrous colonies where workers are more related to their own sons and nephews than to their brothers. In early-switching colonies, workers might start laying eggs when they know it will be in their own genetic interests, perhaps from a cue that indicates the switch point has been reached and the queen is now laying haploid eggs. In late-switching colonies (where the competition point still occurs at the same time in the cycle), workers may start laying eggs when they detect a change in the queen's pheromone that indicate larvae are developing into new queens. Thus, the outcome of this conflict is mediated through the dominance of the queen and the information available to the workers. While it is assumed that queens usually win this conflict, it is still unclear because some studies have indicated that up to 80% of males are produced by workers. These asymmetries in the timing of egg lying and dominance in B. terrestris might explain why it often does not conform to predicted sex ratios and kin-selection hypotheses, although worker bees are more closely related to their nephews (0.375) than to their brothers (0.25) and kinship selection would lead workers to favor their sons over nephews, and nephews over brothers.

=== Worker–worker conflict ===
Although B. terrestris workers are most directly in competition with the queen for egg laying opportunities, they will still inhibit their sisters from laying eggs in order to have their own sons. This is beneficial to them because they will share more genes with their own sons (.5) rather than their nephews (.375). However, kin theory states that in monandrous colonies, workers will be most closely related to their sisters (0.75) but are more closely related to their sons (0.50) than to their nephews (0.375) and least of all to their brothers (0.25), and would accordingly devote their resources.

== Social and foraging behavior ==
Newly emerged workers start out at the bottom of the dominance hierarchy in the social colony. As they age, they move closer to the position of queen. Queen-side workers are often egg layers and interact more frequently with the queen. This social position may pay off later, after the competition point is reached. When the queen is overthrown by the aggression of the workers, the most dominant worker will have the best likelihood of contributing more eggs to the colony brood and will perhaps climb to the position of "false queen." The queen appears to maintain a constant distance of social dominance from her workers at all points in the cycle, suggesting that she is displaced by the sheer number of workers later in the cycle.

=== Foraging behavior ===
B. terrestris generally forage on a large variety of flower species. Their highest activity is in the morning, with their peak time being noted at around 7–8 am. This is likely because it gets progressively warmer in the afternoon, and foragers prefer ambient temperatures of around 25 °C during nectar and pollen collection.

B. terrestris bees exhibit alloethism, which is where different sized bees perform different tasks. This kind of behavior can be seen most often in foraging activities. Larger bees are more often found foraging outside the nest and will return to the nest with larger amounts of nectar and pollen. It is possible that larger bees might be able to withstand greater temperature variation, avoid predation, and travel larger distances making them selectively advantageous. Distinct social roles based on morphology might also be beneficial for individuals of the colonies, by making the colony operate more efficiently. Small bees can be reared more cheaply and kept for in-nest tasks, while only some larvae will be fed enough to become large foraging bees.

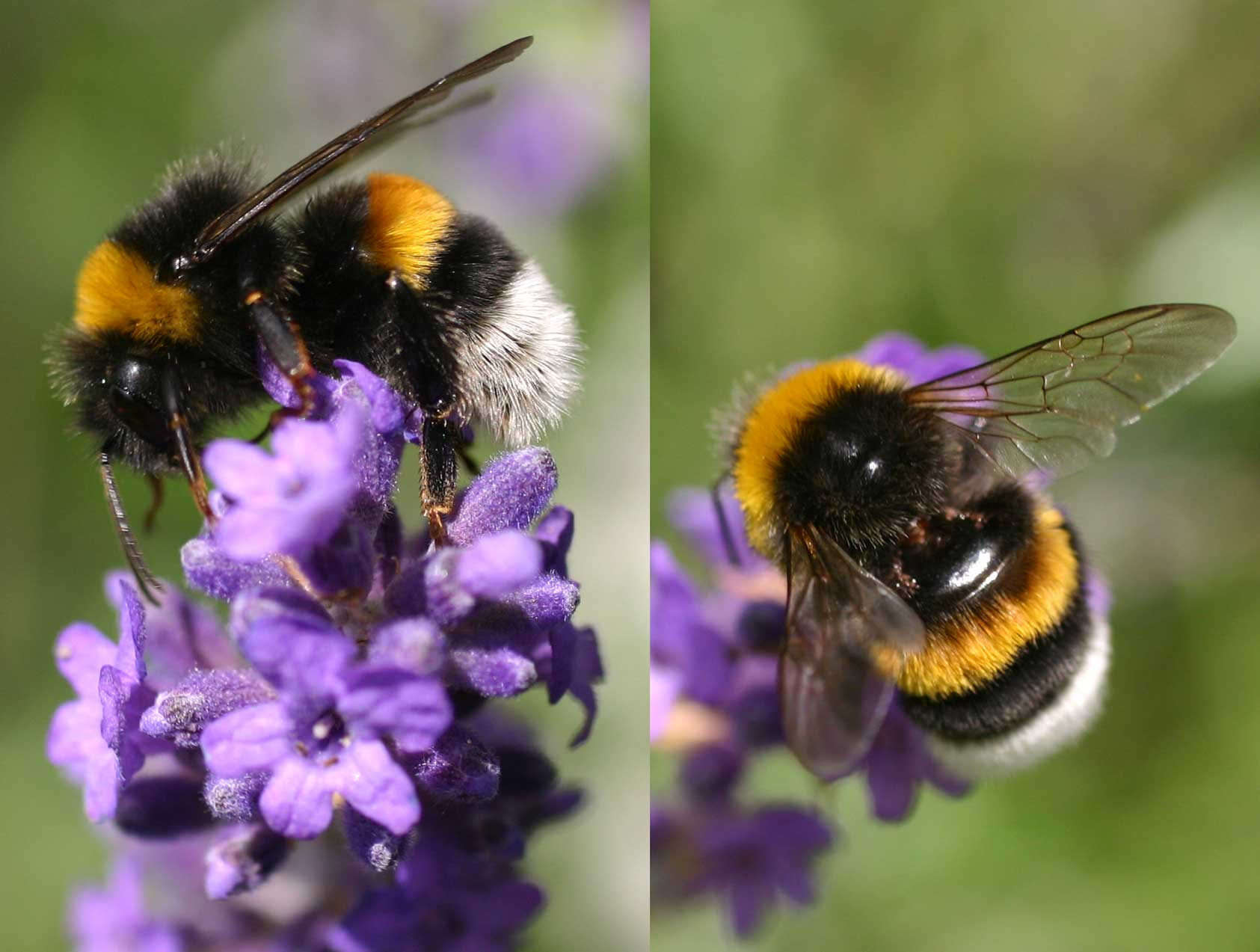
B. terrestris foraging

Individuals who return to the nest after a foraging run often recruit other bees in the colony to leave the nest and search for food. In B. terrestris, successful foragers will return to the nest and run around frantically and without a measurable pattern, unlike the ritualized dance of the honeybee. Although the mechanism by which this recruitment strategy functions is unclear, it is hypothesized that running around likely spreads a pheromone that encourages other bees to exit and forage by indicating the location and odor of food nearby. Colonies with lower food stores will often be more responsive to this foraging pheromone. Conversely, in colonies with ample food reserves bees will be less responsive to these pheromones likely to save time and energy from unnecessary foraging.

B. terrestris has an impressive homing range, where bees displaced from their nests can relocate the colony from up to 9.8 km away. However, the return often takes several days, indicating B. terrestris might be utilizing familiar foliage and natural landmarks to find the nest. This may be a tedious process if an individual is outside the conventional foraging range of the nest. Another study indicated that these bees can navigate their way back to the nest from a distance as far away as 13 km (8.1 mi), although most forage within 5 km of their nest. One mark and recapture study found their average foraging distance to be approximately 663 m. Male bees have also been found to have longer flight ranges than worker bees, likely because they move farther away from the nest to find mates. Males have flight distances of anywhere from 2.6 to 9.9 km. If males also contribute to pollination, this might increase previously predicted pollen flow ranges based on worker flight behavior.

=== Learning ===
Bumblebees and honey bees are extremely influenced by an innate preference for blue and yellow color. When they have no training, they will often just visit flowers that naturally attract them. However, it is generally thought that bees will learn to visit more nectar rewarding flowers after experience associates the reward with the color of the petals. This has been demonstrated in B. terrestris, where bees trained on artificially colored flowers will pick a similar color to the one they were trained with when tested with an array of flower choices. If individuals were tested with flower colors significantly different than from what they were trained with, they just visited flowers most closely aligned with their innate color preferences. In addition to identifying specific colors for foraging purposes, it has also been shown that young worker bees have to learn complex motor skills in order to efficiently collect nectar and pollen from flowers. These skills might take several days to develop, as memory does not always hold perfectly on a day-to-day basis, sometimes deteriorating overnight. Even within a species, different populations have varying levels of innate blue preference and exhibit intraspecific variation in learning rate during association tasks. This is true of two subspecies of B. terrestris, B. terrestris dalmatinus and B. terrestris audax.

A study suggests that bumblebees can do motivational trade-offs.

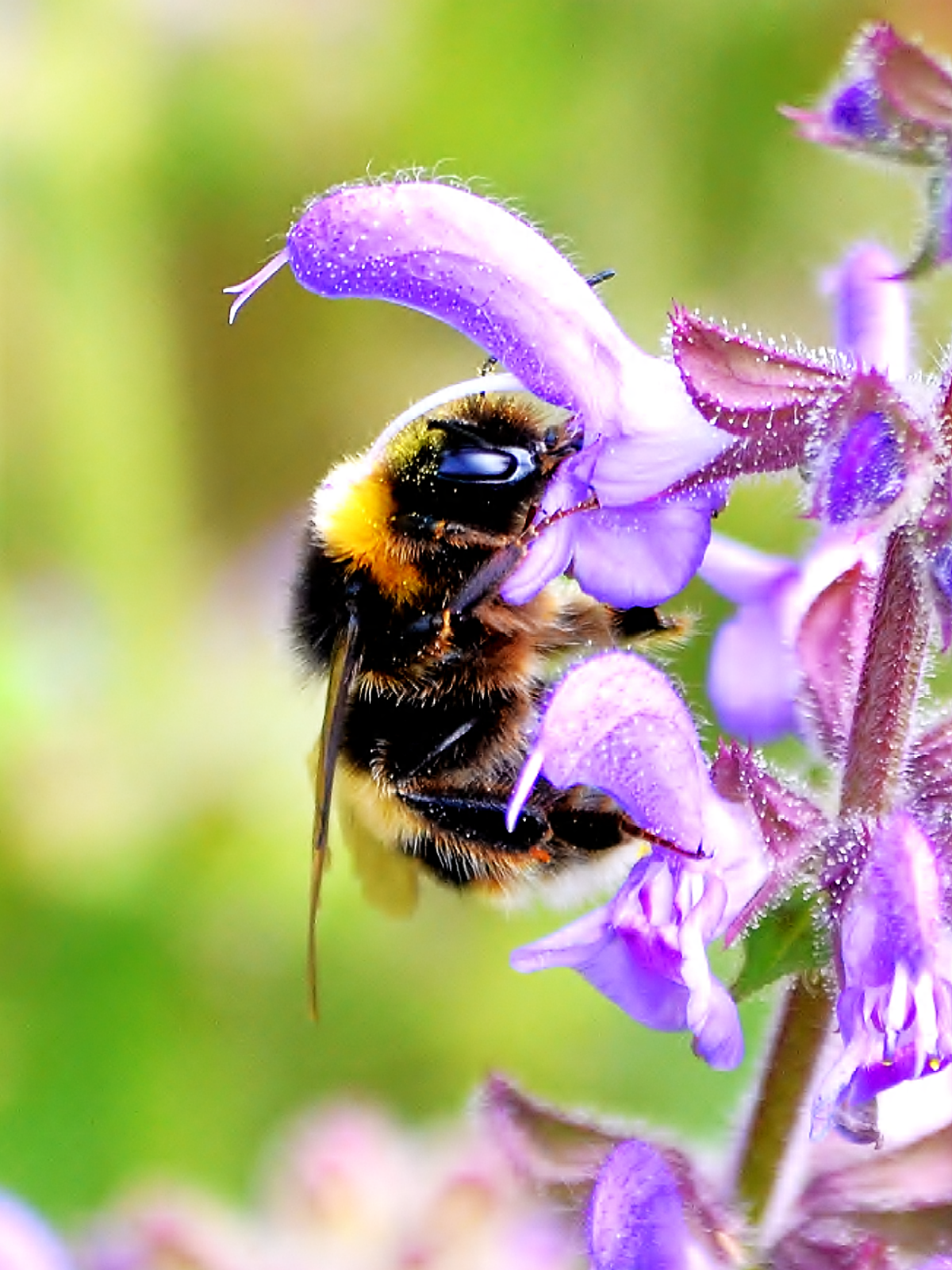
B. terrestris in Oeiras, Portugal

While bees are highly adept at discrimination tasks, they are still limited by the magnitude of difference needed in hue to properly carry out these tests. Error rates of color recognition decrease in B. terrestris when flower pigments are closer together on the color spectrum. This might have damaging effects on pollination efficiency if bees visit different flower species with similar, but distinct colors, which can only be mediated if the flowers have unique shapes.

While bees often forage alone, experiments demonstrate that young foragers might learn what flowers provide the most nectar more quickly when foraging with older workers. B. terrestris individuals have a faster learning curve for visiting unfamiliar, yet rewarding flowers, when they can see a conspecific foraging on the same species. The discovery of this type of associative learning is a novel insight into bee behavior and may supplement learning via color reward association.

== Parasites and disease ==
=== Parasites ===
B. terrestris is parasitized by B. bohemicus, a brood-parasitic cuckoo bee that invades B. terrestris hives and takes over reproductive dominance from the host queen, laying its own eggs that will be cared for by host workers. Another brood parasite is the bee B. vestalis. Both of these are distributed in various regions of Europe. The difference between B. bohemicus and B. vestalis is that the former parasitizes several bumble bee species while B. vestalis exclusively parasitizes B. terrestris.

A common microsporidian parasite that infects the gut of various bumblebee species, including B. terrestris, is Nosema bombi. It can cause a creeping disease and is detrimental to the fitness of its bumblebee host. A study by Manlik et al. (2017) showed that N. bombi infection prevalence varies widely over time, and is associated with mitochondrial DNA genotypes in B. terrestris.

=== Immune response ===
Foraging is considered energetically costly and it is possible that individuals that spend more time foraging suffer costs to their overall fitness. For example, B. terrestris is often vulnerable to parasitism by conopid flies in Central Europe, and it has been hypothesized that foragers might suffer higher incidences of parasites due to the increased metabolic costs of flying. This was demonstrated in a population in which foraging workers had significantly lower levels of encapsulation of an experimental parasitic egg when compared to non-foraging workers. This suggests that foragers have compromised immune systems due to increased energetic expenses and might be predisposed to fly parasites.

While B. terrestris is a singly mating species, a polyandrous system would potentially be beneficial because it would be possible to attain greater genetic variability for resistance against disease. Accordingly, artificially increasing the number of mates a B. terrestris queen obtains through artificial insemination has shown that the increased genetic variability in her offspring confers greater resistance to the most common bumblebee parasite, Crithidia bombi. However, the average reproductive success between one and multiple matings is not linear. Queens that mated once and mated four times had a higher fitness than those that mated twice. This suggests that there might be a fitness barrier to increased matings, which might be why colonies are usually monandrous.

Surprisingly, the immunocompetence, as measured by the ability to encapsulate a novel antigen, does not vary based on the local environment. Experimental studies demonstrate that B. terrestris have equal levels of encapsulation in poor and stable environments. This is unexpected, because immunity should be compromised in conditions where food supply is low in order to save energy. Perhaps encapsulation represents an invariable trait of bumblebees, or immunity is far too complex to characterize solely based on measurements of encapsulation.

Deformed wing virus (DWV) is normally a honey bee pathogen that results in reduced and crumpled wings, making those individuals inviable. This virus is thought to have spread to B. terrestris, and in 2004, as many as 10% of queen bees bred commercially in Europe were found dead with deformed wings. This was confirmed as DWV when B. terrestris colonies tested positive for the presence of DWV RNA. This could indicate that DWV is a broad range pathogen among bees, or perhaps it has recently been infecting new hosts after transmission from honey bees.

Female bee moths (Aphomia sociella) prefer to lay their eggs in the nests of bumblebees. The A. sociella larvae will then hatch and feed on the eggs, larvae, and pupae left unprotected by the bees, sometimes destroying large parts of the nest as they tunnel throughout looking for food.

== Environmental concerns ==
=== Invasive species ===
While native to Europe, B. terrestris has been introduced as a greenhouse pollinator into many foreign ecosystems. The presence of B. terrestris is becoming an ecological concern in many communities in which it is not native. It is classified as an "invasive alien species" in Japan. For example, B. terrestris has a large niche overlap with local Japanese bee species in terms of flower resources and nest sites. B. terrestris queens competing for local underground nest sites are displacing B. hypocrita sapporoensis. However, B. pseudobaicalensis, which visits similar flowers but only forms nests above ground, has not seen a rapid decline in population numbers.

In 2008, the Australian government banned the live import of B. terrestris into Australia on the grounds that it would present a significant risk of becoming a feral species and thereby present a threat to native fauna and flora. In 2004, this bumblebee was classified as a 'Key Threatening Process' by the Scientific Committee of the New South Wales Department of Environment.

This species was introduced to Chile in 1998. It has since crossed into Argentina, and is spreading at about 275 km per year. Its spread has been detrimental to populations of Bombus dahlbomii, which is the only bumblebee species native to southern South America (Patagonia, Southern Chile and Argentina). Bombus terrestris populations facilitated such massive and immediate population decline of Bombus dahlbomii through competition and pathogen introduction/spillover. Bombus ruderatus, a bee previously introduced in 1982, is also seriously affected. The cause is thought to be the parasite Apicystis bombi, an organism carried by the buff-tails, but which has no adverse effect on that species.

=== Colony development in changing environments ===
In temperate areas, variable climates and environmental conditions occur during changing seasons. Lack of available food due to these unpredictable circumstances can often negatively affect colony growth, reproduction, and resistance to parasites. In poor environments with limited food, the few workers born are smaller than average. However, it appears that B. terrestris is well adapted to a changing environment, considering colony growth is higher under variable feeding conditions than under stable feeding conditions. Workers and reproductives are also heavier with a variable food supply when compared to stable food availability. This might indicate an adaptive strategy of increased provisioning to save for days it is hard to find food.

=== Pesticide exposure ===
In their 2014 study published in Functional Ecology researchers using radio-frequency identification (RFID) tagging technology on the bees, found that a sublethal exposure to either a neonicotinoid (imidacloprid) and/or a pyrethroid (?-cyhalothrin) over a four-week period caused an impairment of the bumblebee's ability to forage. Research published in 2015 showed that bees prefer solutions containing neonicotinoids, even though the consumption of these pesticides caused them to eat less food overall. This work implies that treating flowering crops with such pesticides presents a sizeable hazard to foraging bees.

== Human importance ==
=== Commercial use ===
Since 1987, B. terrestris has been bred commercially for use as a pollinator in European greenhouse crops, particularly tomatoes—a task which was previously carried out by human hand. B. terrestris has been commercially reared in New Zealand since the early 1990s, and is now used in at least North Africa, Japan, Korea, and Russia, with the global trade in bumblebee colonies probably exceeding 1 million nests per year. In Korea, however, some have chosen Bombus ignitus over the already established commercial pollinator, Bombus terrestris, for fear of competition or genetic contamination by mating with native bumblebee species. Also, there has been a ban on importing B. terrestris into North America which resulted in higher interest in other species like B. impatiens in North America.

Nonetheless, B. terrestris are key commercial pollinators in Europe, which has driven researchers to investigate the influence of agricultural land on the foraging and survival of this species. Monoculture reduces biodiversity in farmland areas, and likely decreases the number of flowering species bees can forage on. B. terrestris consequently exhibits greater nest growth in suburban areas than in farmland, because local suburban gardens promote more plant diversity for bees to feed from. Agriculture has a profound impact on many bumblebees, and is causing widespread decline in several species. However, B. terrestris is still widespread, likely because it can forage at very long distances, making it less sensitive to changes in biodiversity and the environment.
