= Ophiojura =

Scientific classification
- Kingdom: Animalia
- Phylum: Echinodermata
- Class: Ophiuroidea
- Order: Ophiacanthida
- Family: Ophiojuridae; O'Hara, Thuy & Hugall, 2021
- Genus: Ophiojura; O'Hara, Thuy & Hugall, 2021

Type species
- Ophiojura exbodi O'Hara, Thuy & Hugall, 2021

Genus of brittle stars

Ophiojura is a genus of brittle star in its own family, Ophiojuridae. It has only one known species, Ophiojura exbodi, collected by the EXBODI expedition from Banc Durand seamount off New Caledonia in 2011 at a depth of 360–460 m (1,200–1,500 ft). The prefix 'Ophio' comes form the Ancient Greek word for serpent, and 'jura' is derived from the Jura Mountains, which lent its name to the Jurassic period.

Ophiojura exbodi has eight arms, each 10 cm (4 in) long and bearing rows of sharp teeth leading to its multitude of jaws, which are also toothed. DNA and fossil evidence shows that it diverged from its nearest relatives 160–200 million years ago, with the best estimate 182 Ma, from the Early Jurassic to the Late Triassic.

The following cladogram shows Ophiojura's relationships to its nearest relatives:

- Ophiuroidea
  - - - Amphilepidida
      - Ophioleucida
    - - Ophiacanthida
        - Ophiodermatina
          - - Ophiodermatidae
            - - Ophiomyxidae
              - Ophiopezidae
          - Ophiocomidae
        - Ophiacanthina
          - - - - - - Ophiacanthidae
                    - Clarkcomidae
                  - Ophiopteridae
                - Ophiotomidae
              - Ophiocamacidae
            - Ophiobyrsidae
          - Ophiojura
      - Ophioscolecida
  - - Ophiurida
    - Euryalida
