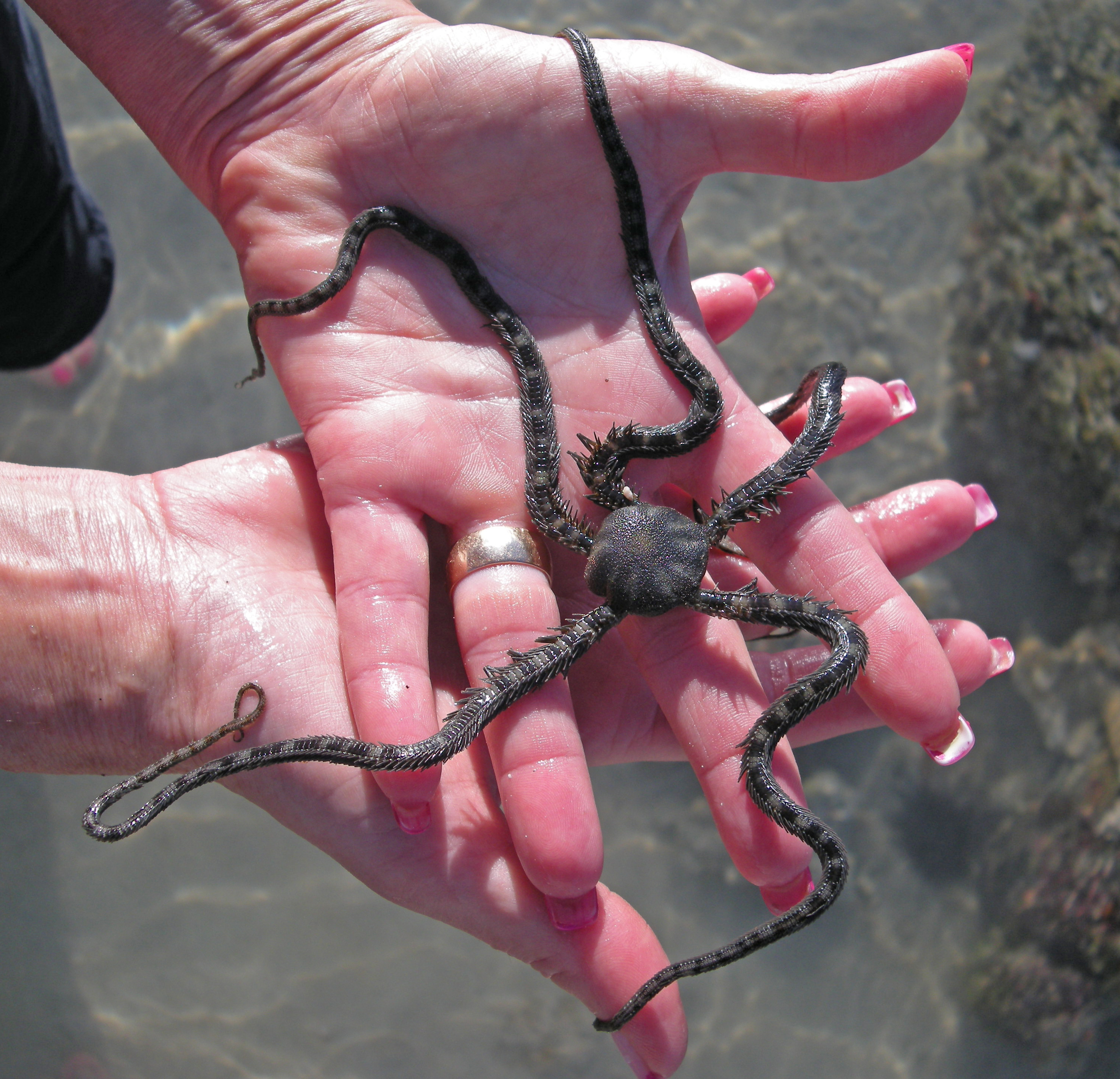
- Opiocomella alexandri in the Gulf of California

Scientific classification
- Kingdom: Animalia
- Phylum: Echinodermata
- Class: Ophiuroidea
- Order: Ophiacanthida
- Family: Ophiocomidae
- Genus: Ophiocomella
- Species: O. alexandri

Binomial name
- Ophiocomella alexandri (Lyman, 1860)

Synonyms
- Ophiocoma alexandri Lyman, 1860

= Ophiocomella alexandri =

Species of brittle star

Ophiocomella alexandri, known as Alexander's spiny brittle star or banded brittle star, is a species of marine brittle star. It was first described to science by Theodore Lyman in 1860. Lyman states in his description that the animal is named for his friend, Alexander E. R. Agassiz, the son of Lyman's mentor, Louis Agassiz.

== Description ==
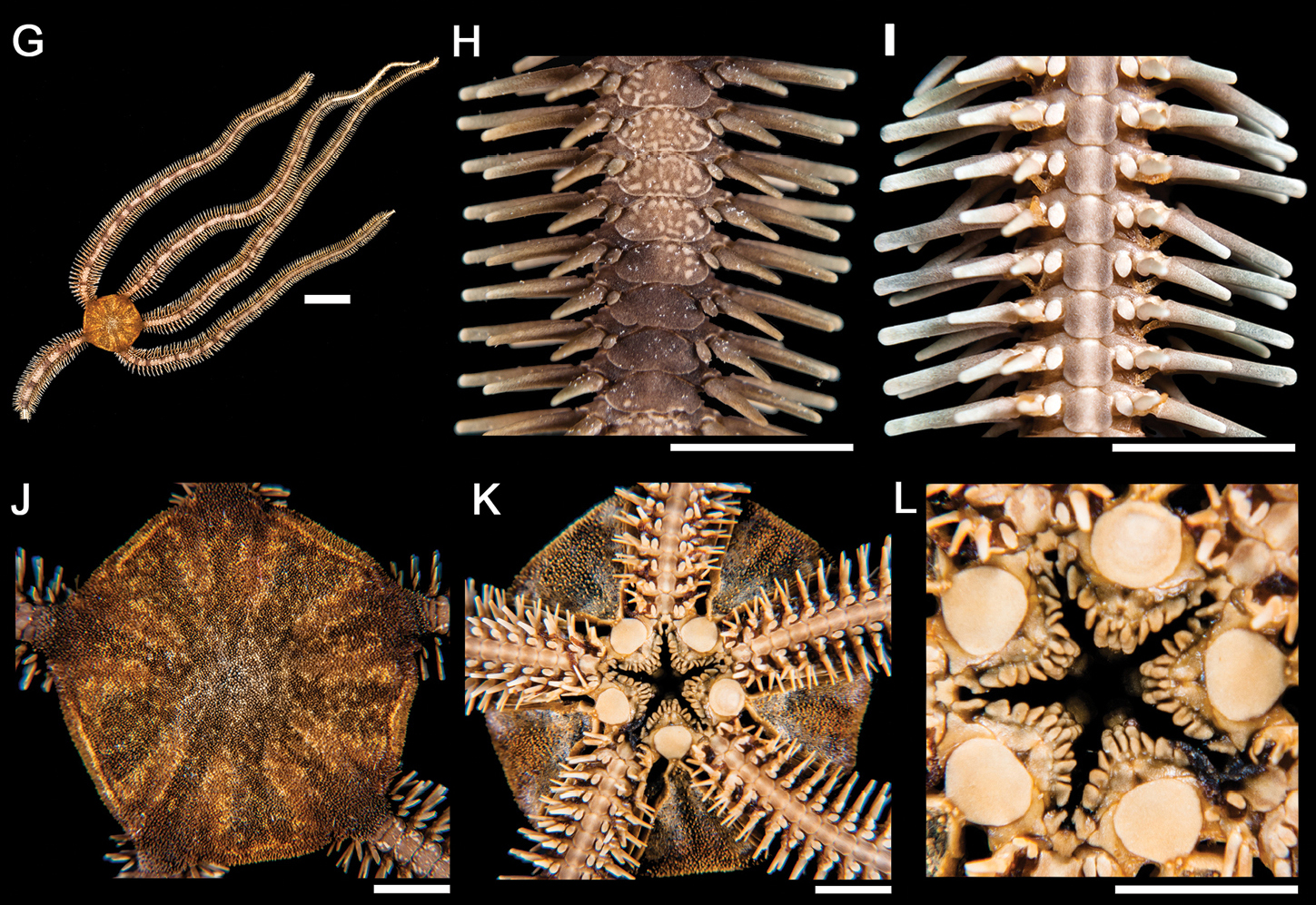
G: dorsal view, H: dorsal view of the arm, I: ventral view of the arm, J: dorsal view of the disk, K: ventral view of the disk, L: jaw

This animal is pentaradially symmetric with five arms attached to a central disk. It is dark brown in color, with lighter bands on the upper side of the arms. The lighter parts are gray with hints of yellow or yellow tones. The colors change on a daily cycle, which, like the banding, may be a form of camouflage to hide the brittle star from predatory fish. Males and females are identical in appearance.

The central disk is rounded with small bumps on its upper side. The disk can be up to 25.2 millimetres (0.99 in) across. It contains the mouth, digestive system, and gonads.

The arms are very flexible, but when straight give the brittle star a diameter of up to 450 millimetres (18 in). As its common name suggests, the arms are quite spiny, with five to seven long spines on each lateral plate.

== Distribution ==
This brittle star lives from the intertidal zone to a depth of 70 meters (230 feet). It is benthic, living on the sea bed, favoring rocky bottoms and coral reefs. The species lives in the eastern Pacific Ocean from southern California to Colombia, including the Gulf of California. It is found in the Galapagos Islands.

== Life history ==
Alexander's brittle stars reproduce by broadcast spawning. It is gonochoric, having individuals that are either male or female, with approximately equal numbers of each sex. Males and females release sperm and eggs into the sea where they meet for fertilization. These zygotes develop into free-swimming pluteus larva.

This species feeds on detritus. There is evidence that these brittle stars catch and eat small fish in aquariums.
