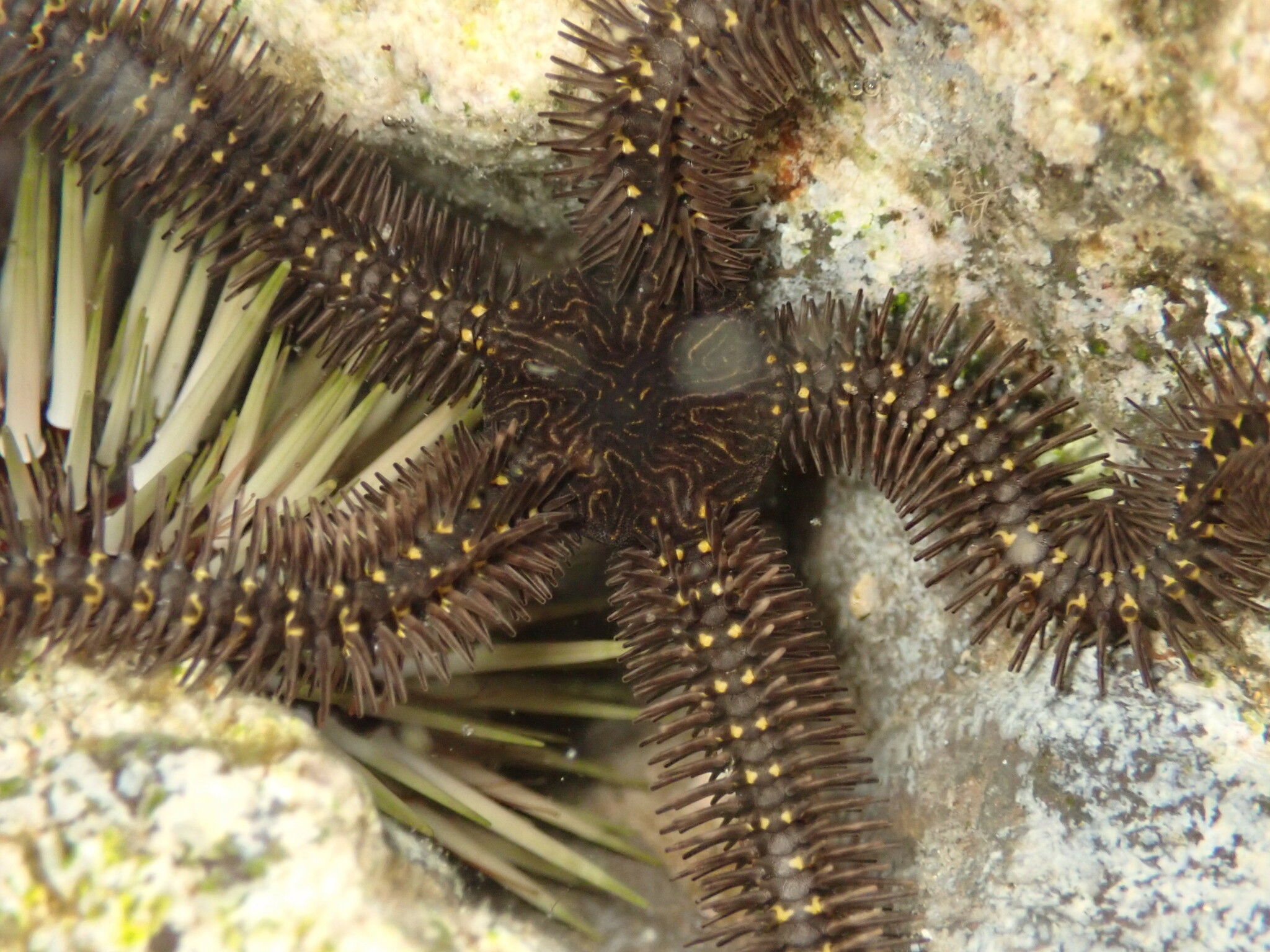

Scientific classification
- Kingdom: Animalia
- Phylum: Echinodermata
- Class: Ophiuroidea
- Order: Ophiacanthida
- Family: Ophiocomidae
- Genus: Breviturma
- Species: B. pica

Binomial name
- Breviturma pica (Müller & Troschel, 1842)

Synonyms
- List: Ophiocoma lineolata Müller & Troschel, 1842; Ophiocoma pica Müller & Troschel, 1842; Ophiocoma sannio Lyman, 1861

= Breviturma pica =

Species of brittle star

Breviturma pica, the yellow-spotted brittle star, is a species of brittle star in the family Ophiocomidae. The species epithet, pica, translates to "magpie" for its resemblance to the bird with black and white feathers.

== Description ==
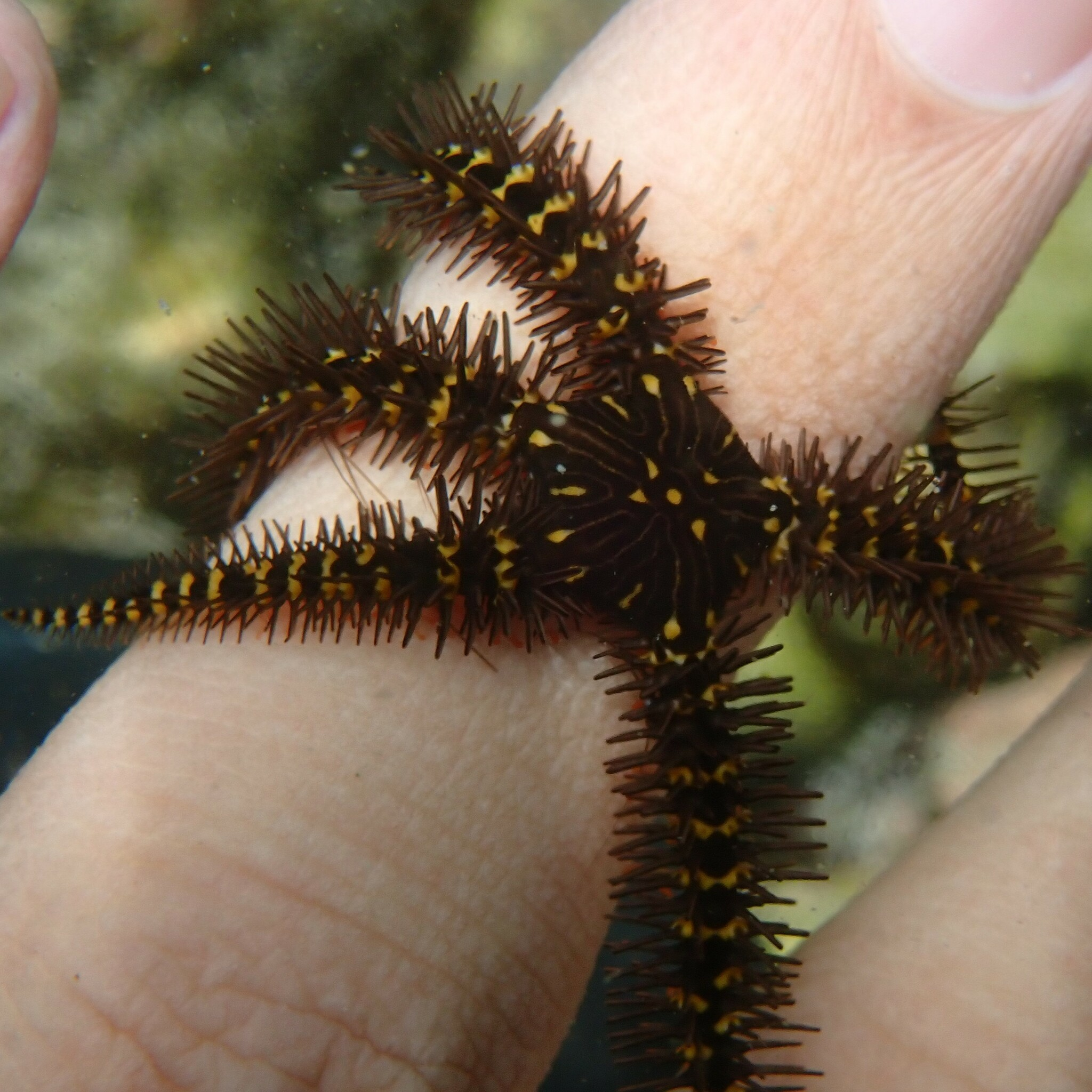
size reference

Breviturma pica has looping white and gold lines on its body. Its five arms are 3 in (76 mm) long with yellow plates and numerous spines. Its body is about 1 in (25 mm) in diameter. Its total size is 8 in (200 mm) on average.

== Distribution ==
Breviturma pica can be found in the Indo-Pacific, including Hawaii, Micronesia, Taiwan, Northern Australia, South Africa, and Southern Israel.

== Habitat ==
Breviturma pica often lives in between the branches of cauliflower coral and sometimes under stones. It lives in depths of 7–200 m (20–660 ft).
