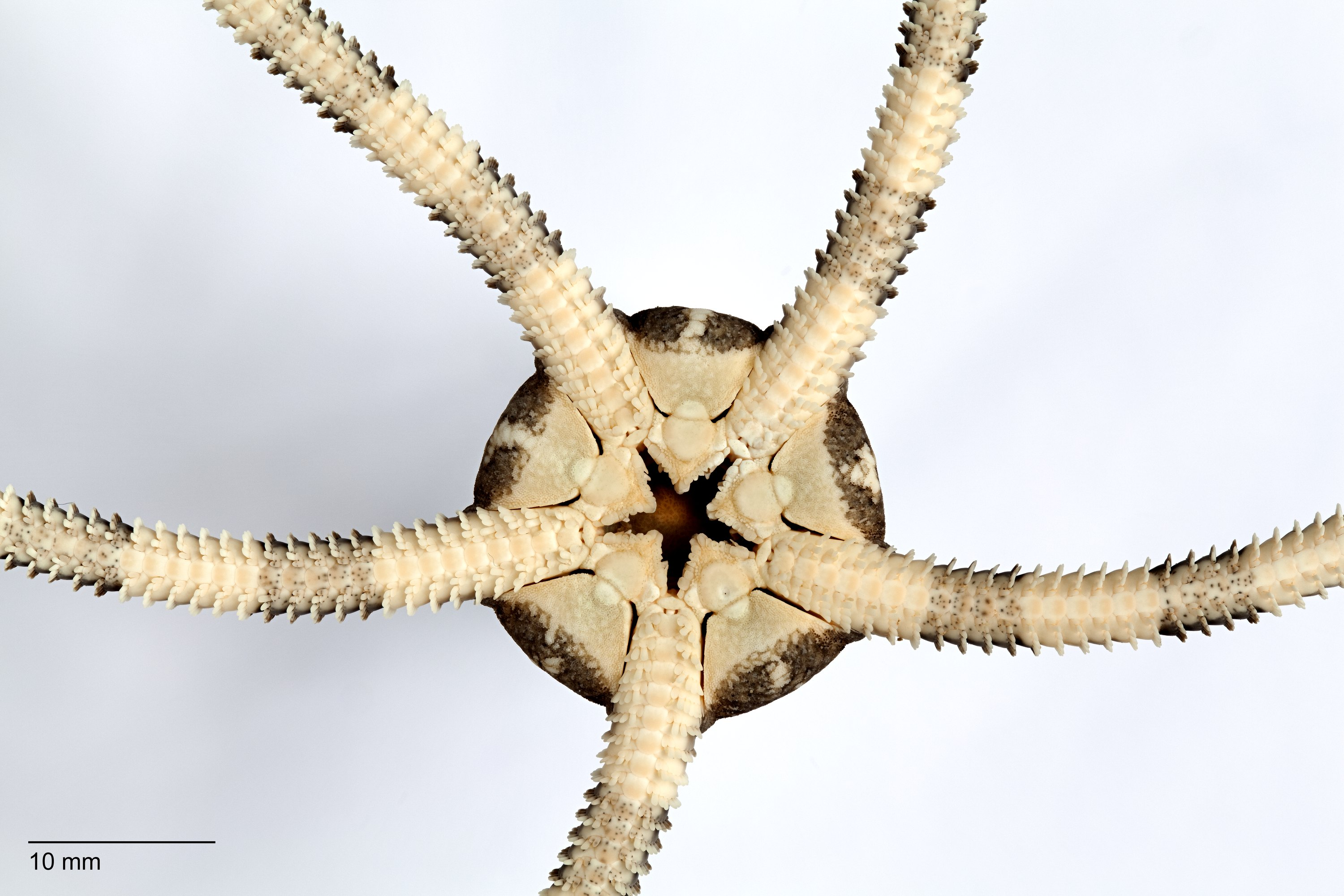
- Ophiarachnella ramsayi

Scientific classification
- Kingdom: Animalia
- Phylum: Echinodermata
- Class: Ophiuroidea
- Order: Ophiacanthida
- Family: Ophiodermatidae
- Genus: Ophiarachnella; Ljungman, 1872

= Ophiarachnella =

Genus of brittle stars

Ophiarachnella is a genus of echinoderms belonging to the family Ophiodermatidae.

The species of this genus are found in Southern Hemisphere.

Species:

- Ophiarachnella africana Koehler, 1914
- Ophiarachnella capensis (Bell, 1888)
- Ophiarachnella differens Murakami, 1944
- Ophiarachnella elegans (Bell, 1894)
- Ophiarachnella gorgonia (Müller & Troschel, 1842)
- Ophiarachnella honorata (Koehler, 1904)
- Ophiarachnella infernalis (Müller & Troschel, 1842)
- Ophiarachnella macracantha H.L. Clark, 1909
- Ophiarachnella megalaspis H.L. Clark, 1911
- Ophiarachnella parvispina H.L. Clark, 1925
- Ophiarachnella paucigranula H.L. Clark, 1938
- Ophiarachnella paucispina (Koehler, 1905)
- Ophiarachnella petersi (Lyman, 1878)
- Ophiarachnella planispina Liao, 2004
- Ophiarachnella ramsayi (Bell, 1888)
- Ophiarachnella semicincta (Studer, 1882)
- Ophiarachnella septemspinosa (Müller & Troschel, 1842)
- Ophiarachnella similis (Koehler, 1905)
- Ophiarachnella snelliusi (A.H. Clark, 1964)
- Ophiarachnella sphenisci (Bell, 1894)
- Ophiarachnella stabilis (Koehler, 1905)
- Ophiarachnella stearnsii (Ives, 1891)
