= Ophiocanops fugiens =

Scientific classification
- Kingdom: Animalia
- Phylum: Echinodermata
- Class: Ophiuroidea
- Order: Ophiacanthida
- Family: Ophiacanthidae
- Genus: Ophiocanops
- Species: O. fugiens

Binomial name
- Ophiocanops fugiens Koehler, 1922

Species of brittle star

Ophiocanops fugiens is a species of brittle star in the family Ophiacanthidae. Though once considered to be the only one living species in its family, three specimens of a different species of Ophiocanops were discovered in 2008. It has been regarded as the most primitive brittle star, close to Paleozoic forms, though other authors have disagreed with the view.

== Taxonomy ==
The genus Ophiocanops was previously placed in the order of arachic brittle stars, Oegophiurida. Following a major overhaul of higher taxonomy of brittle stars in 2017 by O'Hara et al., it is now placed in the order Ophiacanthida. Ophiocanops fugiens is one of the three species (other being O. felli and O. multispina) belonging to Ophiocanops.

== Description ==
O. fugiens displays a central, armored, disk-shape body that is clearly demarcated from the arms and is 3mm in diameter. The arms reach lengths of 35-40mm and are roughly 1mm across with spines. The arms lack dorsal and ventral shields; the madreporite is on edge of central disc. The digestive glands (caecum) extend into proximal portions of arms. The caecum wall has many folds which enlarge the absorbing surface. The skeleton is similar to other ophiuroids, except the paired right and left vertebrae are not fused. Also absent are ventral arm plates and radial and oral shields.

It has no bursae for gonads and gas exchange/excretion. It's incredibly small and compact central disc is proposed to have developed to lessen pressure of predation, as O. fugiens is capable of regenerating arms. O. fugiens demonstrates a small, triangular plated mouth, featuring a set of six conically arranged teeth. It has been reported to be dark brown or purple in color, sometimes exhibiting spotted coloration. The species lacks eyes like other brittle stars, but receives and responds to changes in light via photoreceptive tissues in their appendages.

There are no reports of sexual dimorphism within the species. Highly developed gonads extend into the arms, and it is presumed that female O. fugiens broods fertilized eggs in the arms, and release them through a distinguishable genital slit, also apparent on the arms. Juvenile development is lecithotrophic, meaning the larvae feed on yolk in order to develop to metamorphosis. As larvae develops, the anus is lost, and intestines are not apparent.

== Ecology ==
O. fugiens is found in South Asian seas, with studied specimens being found on the shores of the Philippines. It can be found in waters as shallow as the seashore floor to depths of 200 meters, and has been found to have a mutualistic symbiotic relationship with Black Corals. O. fugiens is a detritivore and a scavenger.
