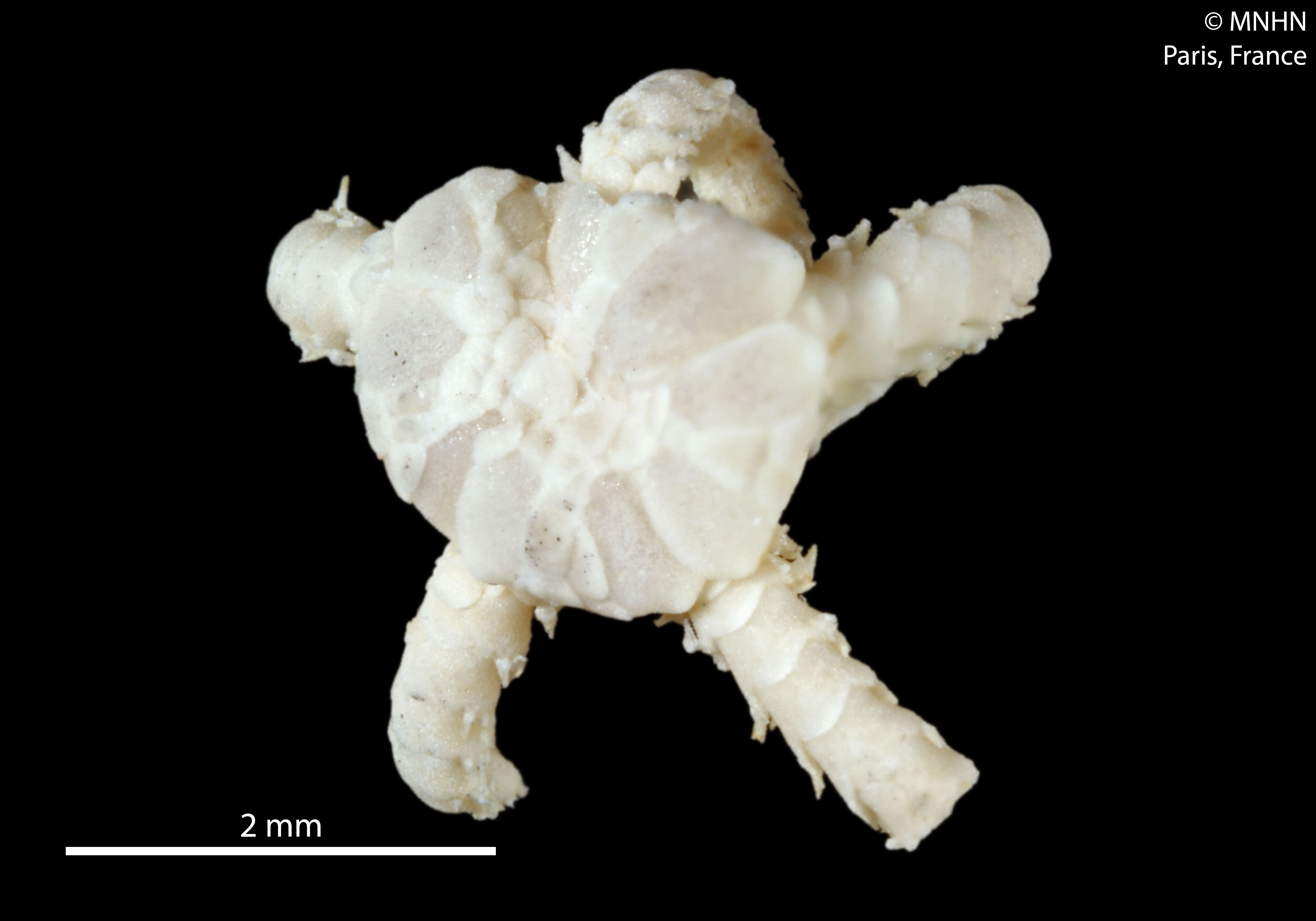

Scientific classification
- Kingdom: Animalia
- Phylum: Echinodermata
- Class: Ophiuroidea
- Order: Ophiacanthida
- Family: Ophiacanthidae
- Genus: Ophiohamus; O'Hara & Stöhr, 2006

Type species
- Ophiohamus nanus O'Hara & Stöhr, 2006

= Ophiohamus =

Genus of brittle stars

Ophiohamus is a genus of brittle stars in the family Ophiacanthidae from New Caledonia. Timothy D. O'Hara and Sabine Stöhr circumscribed and named the genus in 2006; they described the type species Ophiohamus nanus in the same work. A second species, Ophiohamus georgemartini, was described by O'Hara and Caroline Harding in 2015. As of 2018, those are the only two species recognized in this genus.

The genus is distinguished from other closely related genera such as Ophiomitrella and Ophiurothamnus by a combination of the following characteristics:

- discs with coarse, overlapping disc plates integrated with large, contiguous radial shields, sometimes with spines;
- interradial incision shallow, the distal two with widened outer papillae;
- small oral and adoral shields, the former distal to the latter and contiguous with the lateral arm plate;
- arms curving but not coiling;
- 3–4 short arm spines, restricted laterally to the arm;
- arm spines up to or just exceeding a segment in length;
- lowest arm spine semi-hooked;
- jaw slit enclosing oral tentacles; and
- simple tentacle scale covering small tentacle pore.
