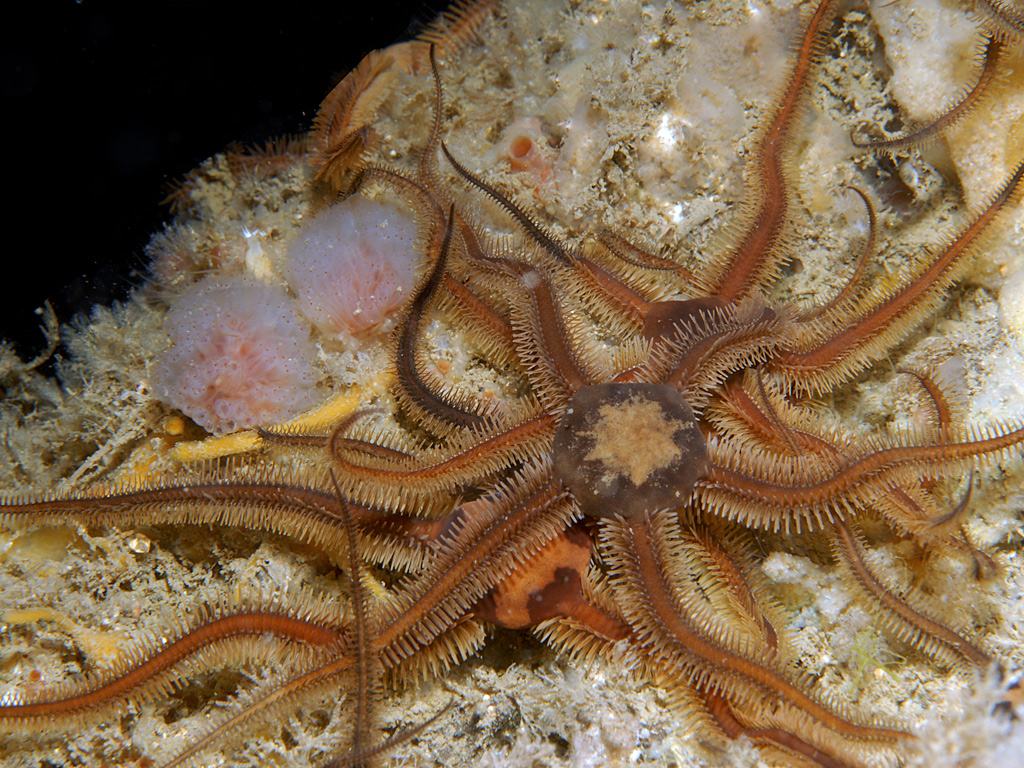
- Ophiocomina nigra

Scientific classification
- Kingdom: Animalia
- Phylum: Echinodermata
- Class: Ophiuroidea
- Order: Ophiacanthida
- Family: Ophiotomidae
- Genus: Ophiocomina; Koehler in Mortensen, 1920

= Ophiocomina =

Genus of echinoderms

Ophiocomina is a genus of brittle stars belonging to the family Ophiotomidae. They are distributed worldwide.

== Selected species ==
There are two species:

- Ophiocomina arnaudi O'Hara & Thuy, 2022
- Ophiocomina nigra (Abildgaard in O.F. Müller, 1789)

Ophiocomina australis is now recognized as Clarkcoma australis.
