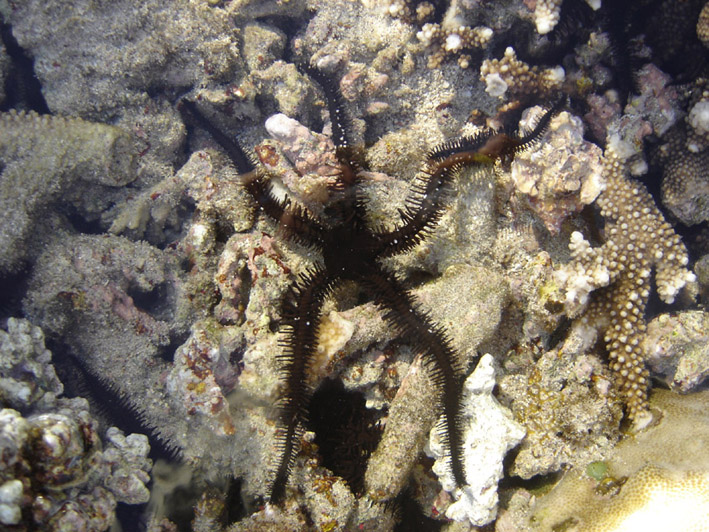

Scientific classification
- Kingdom: Animalia
- Phylum: Echinodermata
- Class: Ophiuroidea
- Order: Ophiacanthida
- Family: Ophiocomidae
- Genus: Ophiocoma
- Species: O. erinaceus

Binomial name
- Ophiocoma erinaceus Müller & Troschel, 1842

= Ophiocoma erinaceus =

Species of marine animal

Ophiocoma erinaceus is an echinoderm, more specifically a brittle star of the Ophiocomidae family.

== Description ==
Ophiocoma erinaceus is black with red tube feet. On the arm segments, there are three arm spines on one segment while the other has four. The next segment occurs in reverse order. In Hawaii, it is the largest brittle star, with sizes of the arms going up to 5 ½ inches, and the disk can be about 1 inch in diameter.

== Distribution and habitat ==
Ophiocoma erinaceus is distributed within the Indo-Pacific oceans and can be found under rocks and stones.

== Human uses ==
The saponin and antioxidants Ophiocoma erinaceus produces is the subject of interest to researchers as it has been studied for medical research. It has been observed that the saponin extracted from Ophiocoma erinaceus can decrease and inhibit the growth of HeLa human cervix cancer cells.
