= Ophiacanthidae =

Ophiacanthidae Temporal range: 192.9–0 Ma Early Jurassic to Present
- Ophiolimna species

Scientific classification
- Kingdom: Animalia
- Phylum: Echinodermata
- Class: Ophiuroidea
- Order: Ophiacanthida
- Suborder: Ophiacanthina
- Family: Ophiacanthidae; Ljungman, 1867

Type genus
- Ophiacantha Müller & Troschel, 1842

Genera
- 35, see text

Synonyms
- Ophiacanthinae Paterson, 1985; Ophiocanopidae Mortensen, 1932; Ophiochondrinae Verrill, 1899; Ophioplinthacinae Paterson, 1985

Family of brittle stars

Ophiacanthidae is a family of brittle stars in the order Ophiacanthida. With 35 genera, it is the largest family of brittle stars.

The earliest fossil from this family (Ophiogaleus dorecki†) dates back to the Pliensbachian in the Early Jurassic. (Note: The species is listed by its synonym Ophiacantha dorecki.) Fossils have also been found dating to the Aptian in the Early Cretaceous.

== Taxonomy ==
Ophiacantha bidentata

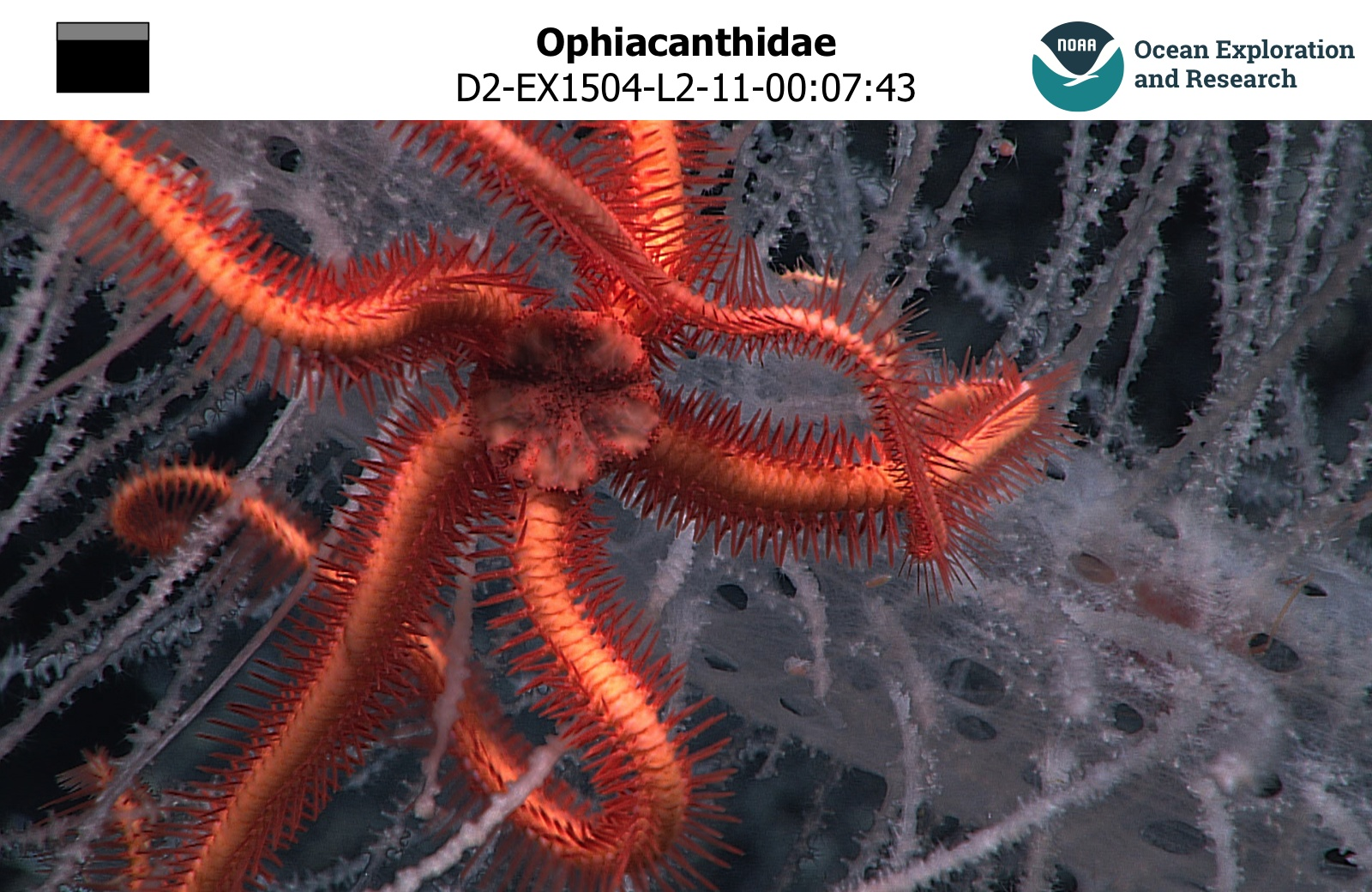
Ophiacanthidae sp.

Ljungman circumscribed this taxon in 1867; he initially named the subfamily Ophiacanthinae within the family Amphiuridae. Gordon L. J. Paterson promoted its rank to family in 1985.

There are a total of 35 generea, of which 19 are extant and 16 are extinct.

- Alternacantha† Thuy & Meyer, 2012
- Brezinacantha† Thuy, Landman, Larson & Numberger-Thuy, 2018
- Europacantha† Thuy, 2013
- Geromura† Thuy, 2013
- Hanshessia† Thuy & Meyer, 2012
- Ishidacantha† Thuy, 2013
- Juracantha† Thuy, Marty & Comment, 2013
- Krohcoma† Thuy, 2013
- Manfredura† Thuy, 2013
- Ophiacantha Müller & Troschel, 1842
- Ophialcaea Verrill, 1899
- Ophiectodia Verrill, 1899
- Ophientrema Verrill, 1899
- Ophiocanops Koehler, 1922
- Ophiochondrus Lyman, 1869
- Ophiodiplax Koehler, 1911
- Ophiogaleus† Thuy, 2013
- Ophiohamus O'Hara & Stöhr, 2006
- Ophiojagtus† Thuy, 2013
- Ophiolebella Mortensen, 1936
- Ophiolebes Lyman, 1878
- Ophioleviathan† Thuy, 2013
- Ophiolimna Verrill, 1899
- Ophiomalleus† Thuy, 2013
- Ophiomitrella Verrill, 1899
- Ophiomoeris Koehler, 1904
- Ophiophthalmus Matsumoto, 1917 non Fitzinger, 1843
- Ophioplinthaca Verrill, 1899
- Ophioripa Koehler, 1922
- Ophiosabine O'Hara & Thuy, 2022
- Ophiosemnotes Matsumoto, 1917
- Ophiosternle† Thuy & Schulz, 2012
- Ophiurothamnus Matsumoto, 1917
- Reitneracantha† Thuy, 2013
- Sabinacantha† Thuy, 2013

The phylogenetic tree per O'Hara et al. (2017) is as follows.

- Ophiacanthida
  - - Ophiacanthina
      - - - - - Ophiacanthidae
              - Clarkcomidae
            - Ophiopteridae
          - Ophiotomidae
        - Ophiocamacidae
      - Ophiobyrsidae
  - Ophiodermatina
    - - Ophiodermatoidea
        - - Ophiomyxidae
          - Ophiopezidae
        - Ophiodermatidae
      - Ophiocomoidea
        Ophiocomidae
