= Ophintegrida =

Ophintegrida Temporal range: 365.2–0 Ma Late Devonian to Present

Scientific classification
- Kingdom: Animalia
- Phylum: Echinodermata
- Class: Ophiuroidea
- Infraclass: Metophiurida
- Superorder: Ophintegrida; O'Hara, Hugall, Thuy, Stöhr & Martynov, 2017

Orders
- Amphilepidida; Ophiacanthida; Ophioleucida; Ophioscolecida

Order of brittle stars

Ophintegrida is one of the two superorders of echinoderms belonging to the class Ophiuroidea. It contains four orders, Amphilepidida, Ophiacanthida, Ophioleucida and Ophioscolecida.

The earliest fossils from this superorder (Amphilepidida - Stephanoura belgica†) date back to the Late Famennian in the Late Devonian. (Note: The source lists the species under Ophiurida but the species has since been classified under Ophintegrida.)
