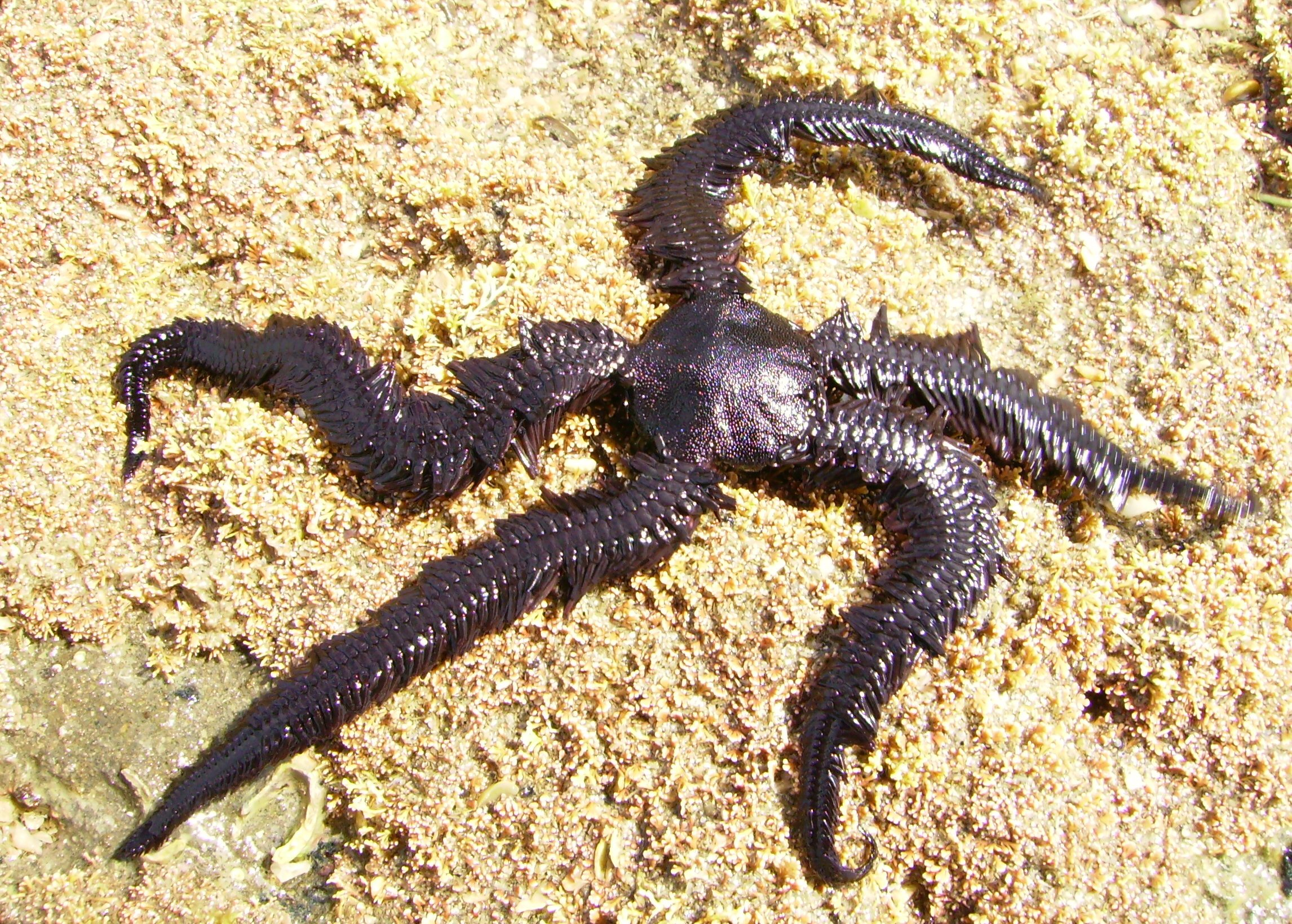
- Ophiopteris antipodum

Scientific classification
- Kingdom: Animalia
- Phylum: Echinodermata
- Class: Ophiuroidea
- Order: Ophiacanthida
- Suborder: Ophiacanthina; O'Hara, Hugall, Thuy, Stöhr & Martynov, 2017

Families
- 7 families, see text

= Ophiacanthina =

Ophiacanthina Temporal range: 237–0 Ma Late Triassic to Present

Suborder of brittle stars

Ophiacanthina is one of the two suborders of echinoderms belonging to the order Ophiacanthida. The suborder contains seven families. Fossils from this suborder have been found dating to the Late Carnian in Late Triassic.

== Taxonomy ==
It was described in 2017 by O'Hara et al. The families in this suborder are as follows.

- Clarkcomidae O'Hara, Stöhr, Hugall, Thuy & Martynov, 2018
- Ophiacanthidae Ljungman, 1867
- Ophiobyrsidae Matsumoto, 1915
- Ophiocamacidae O'Hara, Stöhr, Hugall, Thuy & Martynov, 2018
- Ophiojuridae O'Hara, Thuy & Hugall, 2021
- Ophiopteridae O'Hara, Stöhr, Hugall, Thuy & Martynov, 2018
- Ophiotomidae Paterson, 1985

The phylogenetic tree per O'Hara et al. (2017) is as follows. (Note: It does not contain the family Ophiojuridae as it was described later in 2021)

- Ophiacanthida
  - - Ophiacanthina
      - - - - - Ophiacanthidae
              - Clarkcomidae
            - Ophiopteridae
          - Ophiotomidae
        - Ophiocamacidae
      - Ophiobyrsidae
  - Ophiodermatina
    - - Ophiodermatoidea
        - - Ophiomyxidae
          - Ophiopezidae
        - Ophiodermatidae
      - Ophiocomoidea
        Ophiocomidae
