= Ophiomyxidae =

Ophiomyxidae Temporal range: 184.2–0 Ma Early Jurassic to Present
- Ophiomyxa australis

Scientific classification
- Kingdom: Animalia
- Phylum: Echinodermata
- Class: Ophiuroidea
- Order: Ophiacanthida
- Superfamily: Ophiodermatoidea
- Family: Ophiomyxidae; Ljungman, 1867

Genera
- 7, see text

Synonyms
- Ophiodermatoidea Ljungman, 1867; Ophiarachninae Matsumoto, 1915; Ophiobyrsinae Matsumoto, 1915; Ophiomyxina Fell, 1962

Family of brittle stars

Ophiomyxidae is a family of echinoderms belonging to the order Ophiacanthida. The earliest fossil from this family (Ophiarachna liasica†) dates back to the Early Toarcian in the Early Jurassic.

== Taxonomy ==
There are 7 genera in Ophiomyxidae:

- Neoplax Bell, 1884
- Ophiarachna Müller & Troschel, 1842
- Ophioblenna Lütken, 1859
- Ophioconis Lütken, 1859
- Ophiomyxa Müller & Troschel, 1842
- Ophiostiba Matsumoto, 1915
- Ophiurochaeta Matsumoto, 1915

The phylogenetic tree per O'Hara et al. (2017) is as follows.

- Ophiacanthida
  - - Ophiacanthina
      - - - - - Ophiacanthidae
              - Clarkcomidae
            - Ophiopteridae
          - Ophiotomidae
        - Ophiocamacidae
      - Ophiobyrsidae
  - Ophiodermatina
    - - Ophiodermatoidea
        - - Ophiomyxidae
          - Ophiopezidae
        - Ophiodermatidae
      - Ophiocomoidea
        Ophiocomidae
