= Ophiodermatina =

Ophiodermatina Temporal range: 251.9–0 Ma Early Triassic to Present
- Ophiarachna incrassata

Scientific classification
- Kingdom: Animalia
- Phylum: Echinodermata
- Class: Ophiuroidea
- Order: Ophiacanthida
- Suborder: Ophiodermatina; Ljungman, 1867

Superfamilies
- Ophiocomoidea Ljungman, 1867; Ophiodermatoidea Ljungman, 1867

Suborder of brittle stars

Ophiodermatina is one of the two suborders of echinoderms belonging to the order Ophiacanthida. The suborder contains two superfamilies, which combine contain four families. It also contains five extinct genera.

The earliest fossil from this suborder (Aplocoma torrii†) dates back to the Induan in the Early Triassic. Fossils have also been found dating to the Late Carnian in Late Triassic.

== Taxonomy ==
The classification in this suborder is as follows.

- Superfamily Ophiocomoidea Ljungman, 1867
  - Ophiocomidae Ljungman, 1867
- Superfamily Ophiodermatoidea Ljungman, 1867
  - Ophiodermatidae Ljungman, 1867
  - Ophiomyxidae Ljungman, 1867
  - Ophiopezidae O'Hara, Stöhr, Hugall, Thuy & Martynov, 2018
- Extinct genera:
  - Aplocoma† d'Orbigny, 1852
  - Arenorbis† Hess, 1970
  - Dermocoma† Hess, 1964
  - Ophiotitanos† Spencer, 1907
  - Shoshonura† Thuy, 2019

The phylogenetic tree per O'Hara et al. (2017) is as follows.

- Ophiacanthida
  - - Ophiacanthina
      - - - - - Ophiacanthidae
              - Clarkcomidae
            - Ophiopteridae
          - Ophiotomidae
        - Ophiocamacidae
      - Ophiobyrsidae
  - Ophiodermatina
    - - Ophiodermatoidea
        - - Ophiomyxidae
          - Ophiopezidae
        - Ophiodermatidae
      - Ophiocomoidea
        Ophiocomidae
