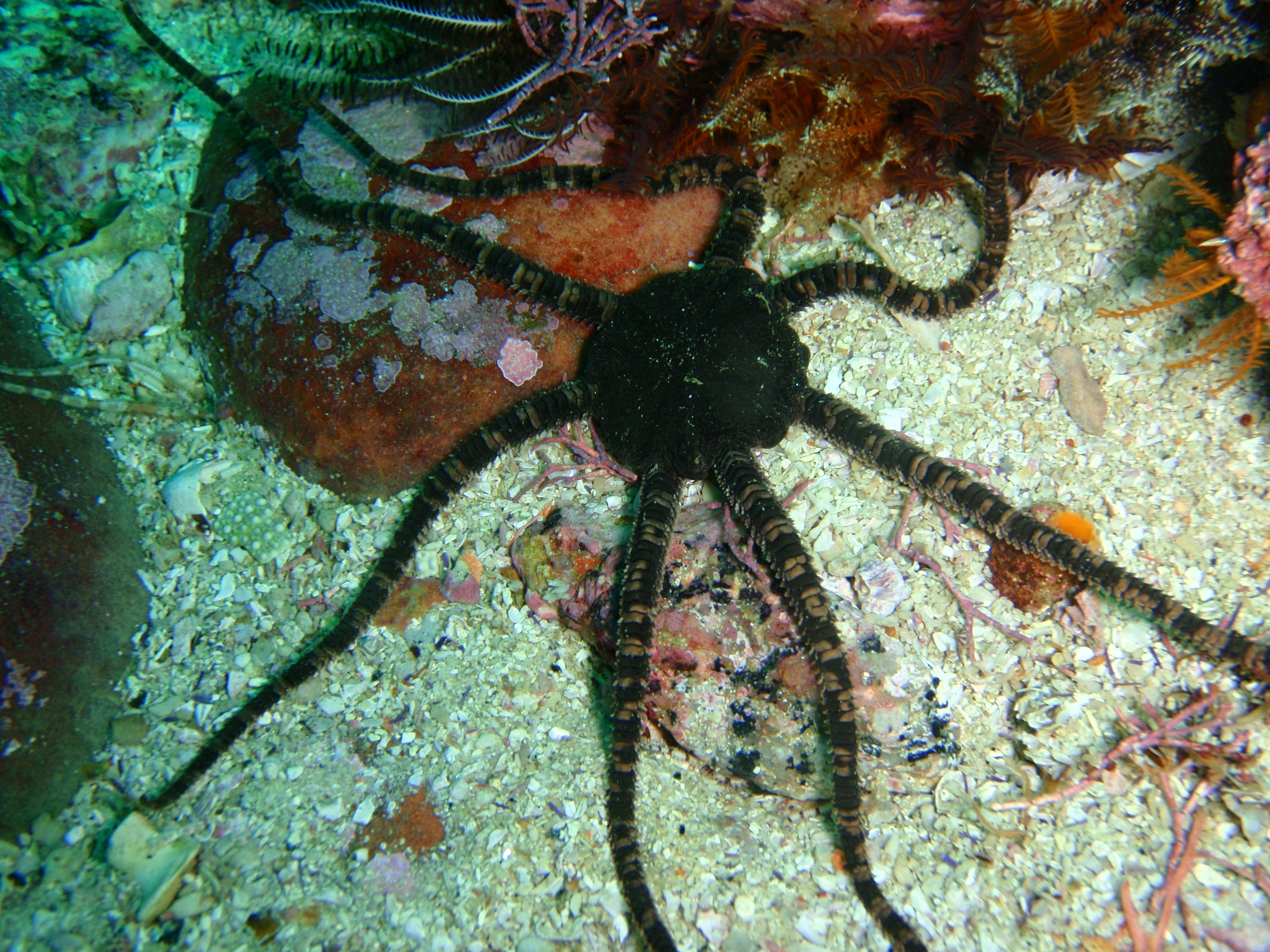
- Ophioderma wahlbergii

Scientific classification
- Kingdom: Animalia
- Phylum: Echinodermata
- Class: Ophiuroidea
- Order: Ophiacanthida
- Superfamily: Ophiodermatoidea
- Family: Ophiodermatidae; Ljungman, 1867

Type genus
- Ophioderma Müller & Troschel, 1840

Genera
- 11, see text

Synonyms
- Ophiodermatinae Ljungman, 1867

= Ophiodermatidae =

Ophiodermatidae Temporal range: 205.7–0 Ma Late Triassic to Present

Family of brittle stars

Ophiodermatidae is a family of brittle stars in the order Ophiacanthida. The earliest certain fossil from this family (Ophioderma waliabadense†) dates back to the Rhaetian in the Late Triassic. (Note: The species is listed by its synonym Ophioderma waliabadensis.)

== Taxonomy ==
There are 11 genera in Ophiodermatidae:

- Bathypectinura H.L. Clark, 1909
- Cryptopelta H.L. Clark, 1909
- Diopederma H.L. Clark, 1913
- Ophiarachnella Ljungman, 1872
- Ophiochasma Grube, 1868
- Ophiocormus H.L. Clark, 1915
- Ophiocryptus H.L. Clark, 1915
- Ophiocypris Koehler, 1930
- Ophioderma Müller & Troschel, 1840
- Ophiomidas Koehler, 1904
- Ophiopsammus Lütken, 1869

The phylogenetic tree per O'Hara et al. (2017) is as follows.

- Ophiacanthida
  - - Ophiacanthina
      - - - - - Ophiacanthidae
              - Clarkcomidae
            - Ophiopteridae
          - Ophiotomidae
        - Ophiocamacidae
      - Ophiobyrsidae
  - Ophiodermatina
    - - Ophiodermatoidea
        - - Ophiomyxidae
          - Ophiopezidae
        - Ophiodermatidae
      - Ophiocomoidea
        Ophiocomidae
