= Ophioleucida =

Ophioleucida Temporal range: 237–0 Ma Late Triassic to Present
- Ophioleuce brevispinum

Scientific classification
- Kingdom: Animalia
- Phylum: Echinodermata
- Class: Ophiuroidea
- Superorder: Ophintegrida
- Order: Ophioleucida; O'Hara, Hugall, Thuy, Stöhr & Martynov, 2017

Families
- Ophiernidae O'Hara, Stöhr, Hugall, Thuy & Martynov, 2018; Ophioleucidae Matsumoto, 1915

Order of brittle stars

Ophioleucida is an order of echinoderms belonging to the class Ophiuroidea. The order contains two families, Ophiernidae and Ophioleucidae with combined 33 species.

Fossils from an extinct genus (Triadoleucella†) of this order have been found dating to the Carnian in Late Triassic.
