= Clarkcoma =

- Clarkcoma canaliculata

Scientific classification
- Kingdom: Animalia
- Phylum: Echinodermata
- Class: Ophiuroidea
- Order: Ophiacanthida
- Family: Clarkcomidae
- Genus: Clarkcoma; O'Hara, Stöhr, Hugall, Thuy & Martynov, 2018

Type species
- Clarkcoma canaliculata (Lütken, 1869)

Species
- 4, see text

Genus of brittle stars

Clarkcoma is a genus of brittle stars in the monogeneric family Clarkcomidae. It has four species.

== Taxonomy ==
The phylogenetic tree of the family per O'Hara et al. (2017) is as follows.

- Ophiacanthida
  - - Ophiacanthina
      - - - - - Ophiacanthidae
              - Clarkcomidae
            - Ophiopteridae
          - Ophiotomidae
        - Ophiocamacidae
      - Ophiobyrsidae
  - Ophiodermatina
    - - Ophiodermatoidea
        - - Ophiomyxidae
          - Ophiopezidae
        - Ophiodermatidae
      - Ophiocomoidea
        Ophiocomidae

The genus has the following four species.

- Clarkcoma australis (H.L. Clark, 1928)
- Clarkcoma bollonsi (Farquhar, 1908)
- Clarkcoma canaliculata (Lütken, 1869)
- Clarkcoma pulchra (H.L. Clark, 1928)
