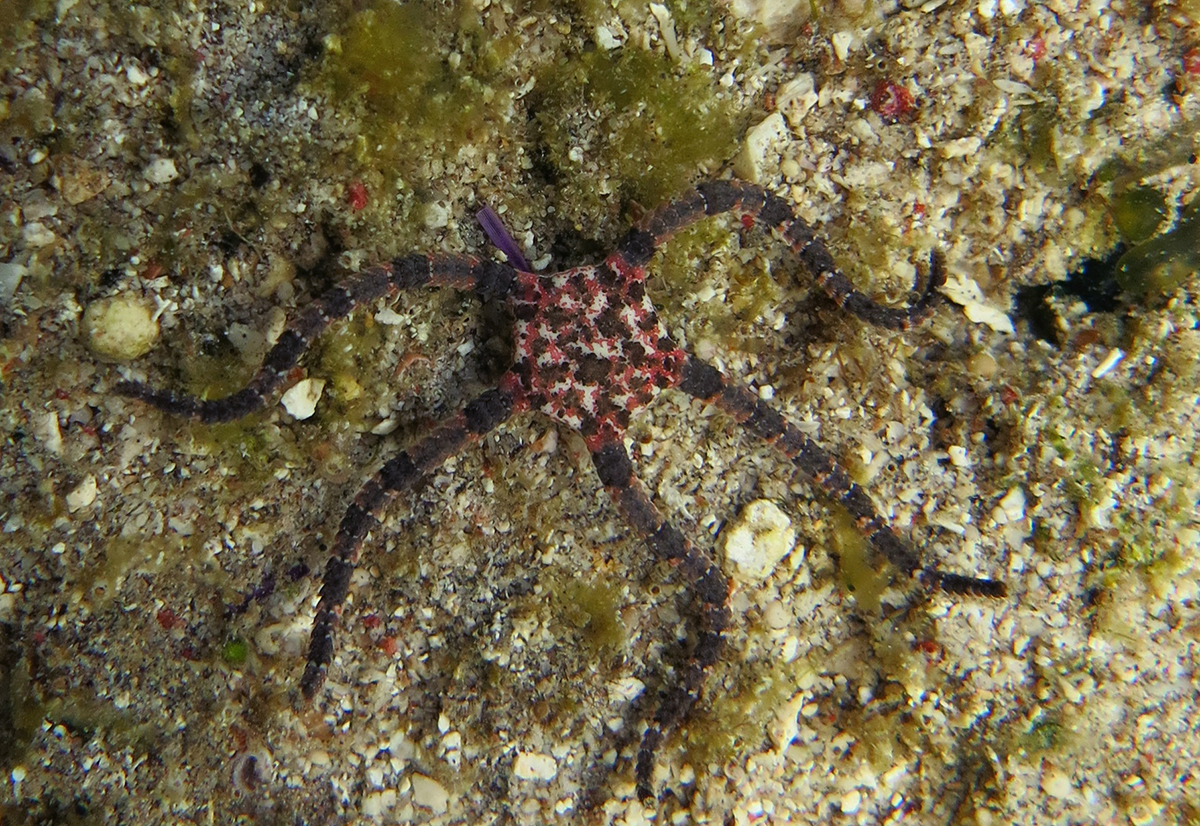
- Ophiopeza fallax

Scientific classification
- Kingdom: Animalia
- Phylum: Echinodermata
- Class: Ophiuroidea
- Order: Ophiacanthida
- Superfamily: Ophiodermatoidea
- Family: Ophiopezidae; O'Hara, Stöhr, Hugall, Thuy & Martynov, 2018

Type genus
- Ophiopeza Peters, 1851

Genera
- Ophiochaeta; Ophiopeza

= Ophiopezidae =

Ophiopezidae Temporal range: 170.9–0 Ma Middle Jurassic to Present

Family of brittle stars

Ophiopezidae is a family of brittle stars in the order Ophiacanthida. The earliest fossil from this family (Ophiopeza ferrugineum†) dates back to the Bajocian in the Middle Jurassic. (Note: The species is listed by its synonym Ophiocten ferrugineum.)

== Taxonomy ==
The following two genera are included in the family.

- Ophiochaeta Lütken, 1869
- Ophiopeza Peters, 1851

The phylogenetic tree per O'Hara et al. (2017) is as follows.

- Ophiacanthida
  - - Ophiacanthina
      - - - - - Ophiacanthidae
              - Clarkcomidae
            - Ophiopteridae
          - Ophiotomidae
        - Ophiocamacidae
      - Ophiobyrsidae
  - Ophiodermatina
    - - Ophiodermatoidea
        - - Ophiomyxidae
          - Ophiopezidae
        - Ophiodermatidae
      - Ophiocomoidea
        Ophiocomidae
