= Ophiocamacidae =

Ophiocamacidae Temporal range: 237–0 Ma Late Triassic to Present
- Ophiocamax gigas (oral view)

Scientific classification
- Kingdom: Animalia
- Phylum: Echinodermata
- Class: Ophiuroidea
- Order: Ophiacanthida
- Suborder: Ophiacanthina
- Family: Ophiocamacidae; O'Hara, Stöhr, Hugall, Thuy & Martynov, 2018

Type genus
- Ophiocamax Lyman, 1878

Genera
- Leadagmara†; Ophiocamax

Family of brittle stars

Ophiocamacidae is a family of brittle stars in the order Ophiacanthida containing two genera. The earliest fossil from this family (Leadagmara gracilispina†) dates back to the Carnian in the Late Triassic.

== Taxonomy ==
The following two genera are included in the family.

- Leadagmara† Thuy, Ishida, Doi & Kroh, 2012
- Ophiocamax Lyman, 1878

The phylogenetic tree per O'Hara et al. (2017) is as follows.

- Ophiacanthida
  - - Ophiacanthina
      - - - - - Ophiacanthidae
              - Clarkcomidae
            - Ophiopteridae
          - Ophiotomidae
        - Ophiocamacidae
      - Ophiobyrsidae
  - Ophiodermatina
    - - Ophiodermatoidea
        - - Ophiomyxidae
          - Ophiopezidae
        - Ophiodermatidae
      - Ophiocomoidea
        Ophiocomidae
