= Ophiobyrsidae =

- Dried preserved specimen of Ophiobyrsa compensata

Scientific classification
- Kingdom: Animalia
- Phylum: Echinodermata
- Class: Ophiuroidea
- Order: Ophiacanthida
- Suborder: Ophiacanthina
- Family: Ophiobyrsidae; Matsumoto, 1915

Type genus
- Ophiobyrsa Lyman, 1878

Genera
- 4, see text

Family of brittle stars

Ophiobyrsidae is a family of brittle stars in the order Ophiacanthida containing four genera.

== Taxonomy ==
The following four genera are included in the family.

- Ophiobyrsa Lyman, 1878
- Ophiobyrsella Verrill, 1899
- Ophiophrixus H.L. Clark, 1911
- Ophiosmilax Matsumoto, 1915

The phylogenetic tree per O'Hara et al. (2017) is as follows.

- Ophiacanthida
  - - Ophiacanthina
      - - - - - Ophiacanthidae
              - Clarkcomidae
            - Ophiopteridae
          - Ophiotomidae
        - Ophiocamacidae
      - Ophiobyrsidae
  - Ophiodermatina
    - - Ophiodermatoidea
        - - Ophiomyxidae
          - Ophiopezidae
        - Ophiodermatidae
      - Ophiocomoidea
        Ophiocomidae
