= Ophiotomidae =

Ophiotomidae Temporal range: 100.5–0 Ma Late Cretaceous to Present
- Ophiocomina nigra

Scientific classification
- Kingdom: Animalia
- Phylum: Echinodermata
- Class: Ophiuroidea
- Order: Ophiacanthida
- Suborder: Ophiacanthina
- Family: Ophiotomidae; Paterson, 1985

Type genus
- Ophiotoma Lyman, 1883

Genera
- 6, see text

Synonyms
- Ophiotominae Paterson, 1985

Family of echinoderms

Ophiotomidae is a family of brittle stars. The family has a worldwide distribution. The earliest fossil from this family (Ophiotreta rasmusseni†) dates back to the Cenomanian in the Late Cretaceous. (Note: The species is listed by its synonym Ophiocoma rasmusseni.)

== Taxonomy ==
It was originally introduced as a subfamily Ophiotominae under the family Ophiacanthidae. There are six genera:

- Ophiocomina Koehler in Mortensen, 1920
- Ophiocopa Lyman, 1883
- Ophiomitra Lyman, 1869
- Ophiopristis Verrill, 1899
- Ophiotoma Lyman, 1883
- Ophiotreta Verrill, 1899

The phylogenetic tree per O'Hara et al. (2017) is as follows.

- Ophiacanthida
  - - Ophiacanthina
      - - - - - Ophiacanthidae
              - Clarkcomidae
            - Ophiopteridae
          - Ophiotomidae
        - Ophiocamacidae
      - Ophiobyrsidae
  - Ophiodermatina
    - - Ophiodermatoidea
        - - Ophiomyxidae
          - Ophiopezidae
        - Ophiodermatidae
      - Ophiocomoidea
        Ophiocomidae
