= Ophiocomidae =

Ophiocomidae Temporal range: 70–0 Ma Late Cretaceous to Present
- Ophiocoma aethiops

Scientific classification
- Kingdom: Animalia
- Phylum: Echinodermata
- Class: Ophiuroidea
- Order: Ophiacanthida
- Superfamily: Ophiocomoidea
- Family: Ophiocomidae; Ljungman, 1867

Type genus
- Ophiocoma L. Agassiz, 1836

Genera
- 4, see text

Synonyms
- Ophiocominae

Family of brittle stars

Ophiocomidae is a family of brittle stars of the order Ophiacanthida. The earliest fossil from this family (Ophiocoma avatar†) dates back to the Late Cretaceous.

== Taxonomy ==
Ophiocomidae was previously placed (along with Ophionereididae) in the superfamily Ophiocomidea and infraorder Gnathophiurina or suborder Gnathophiurina in different classifications. In a major overhaul of taxonomic classification of Ophiuroidea in 2017 per O'Hara et al., it is now an placed in the suborder Ophiacanthina in order Ophiacanthida. It is the only family in the superfamily of Ophiocomoidea.

The phylogenetic tree per O'Hara et al. (2017) is as follows.

- Ophiacanthida
  - - Ophiacanthina
      - - - - - Ophiacanthidae
              - Clarkcomidae
            - Ophiopteridae
          - Ophiotomidae
        - Ophiocamacidae
      - Ophiobyrsidae
  - Ophiodermatina
    - - Ophiodermatoidea
        - - Ophiomyxidae
          - Ophiopezidae
        - Ophiodermatidae
      - Ophiocomoidea
        Ophiocomidae

The following four genera are included in the family according to the World Register of Marine Species (WoRMS):

- Breviturma Stöhr, Boissin & Hoareau, 2013
- Ophiocoma L. Agassiz, 1836
- Ophiocomella A.H. Clark, 1939
- Ophiomastix Müller & Troschel, 1842
