= Axel Ljungman =

Swedish zoologist (1841–1901)

- Born: 1 September 1841; Ljungskile, Bohuslän, Sweden
- Died: 27 October 1901 (aged 60); Gothenburg, Sweden
- Education: Uppsala University
- Scientific career
- Fields: Zoology
- Workplaces: Uppsala University
- Author abbrev. (zoology): Ljungman

Axel Ljungman (1 September 1841 – 27 October 1901) was a Swedish zoologist and member of the second chamber (lower house) of parliament.

== Biography ==
Ljungman was born in Ljungskile, Bohuslän on 1 September 1841. He enrolled at Uppsala University in 1859 where he also received his PhD in 1872. From 1871 up till 1884, Ljnugman worked as an associate professor of zoology at Uppsala University. As a zoologist, he named various taxa of brittle stars in 1866. While holding this position, Ljungman also worked to promote the Bohuslän herring fishery.

Between the years 1880–1882 and 1885–1896, he was on the Gothenburg and Bohus County Councils. From 1881 to 1899 he was a member of the second chamber for Orust and Tjörn. He was also the vice chairman of the Constitution Committee in 1887 and from 1891 to 1898. As a member of the Riksdag, he worked on fisheries issues and for expanding the telephone network in Bohuslän. He was a member of the committee on the regulation of sea fishing in Gothenburg and Bohus counties (1892–1894), where he worked on proposals for a law on the right to fish (1894) and on municipal taxation (1897). In 1900, he was appointed quarantine master on the port of Känsö.

Ljungman died on 27 October 1901 in Gothenburg.

== See also ==
- Category:Taxa named by Axel Ljungman
