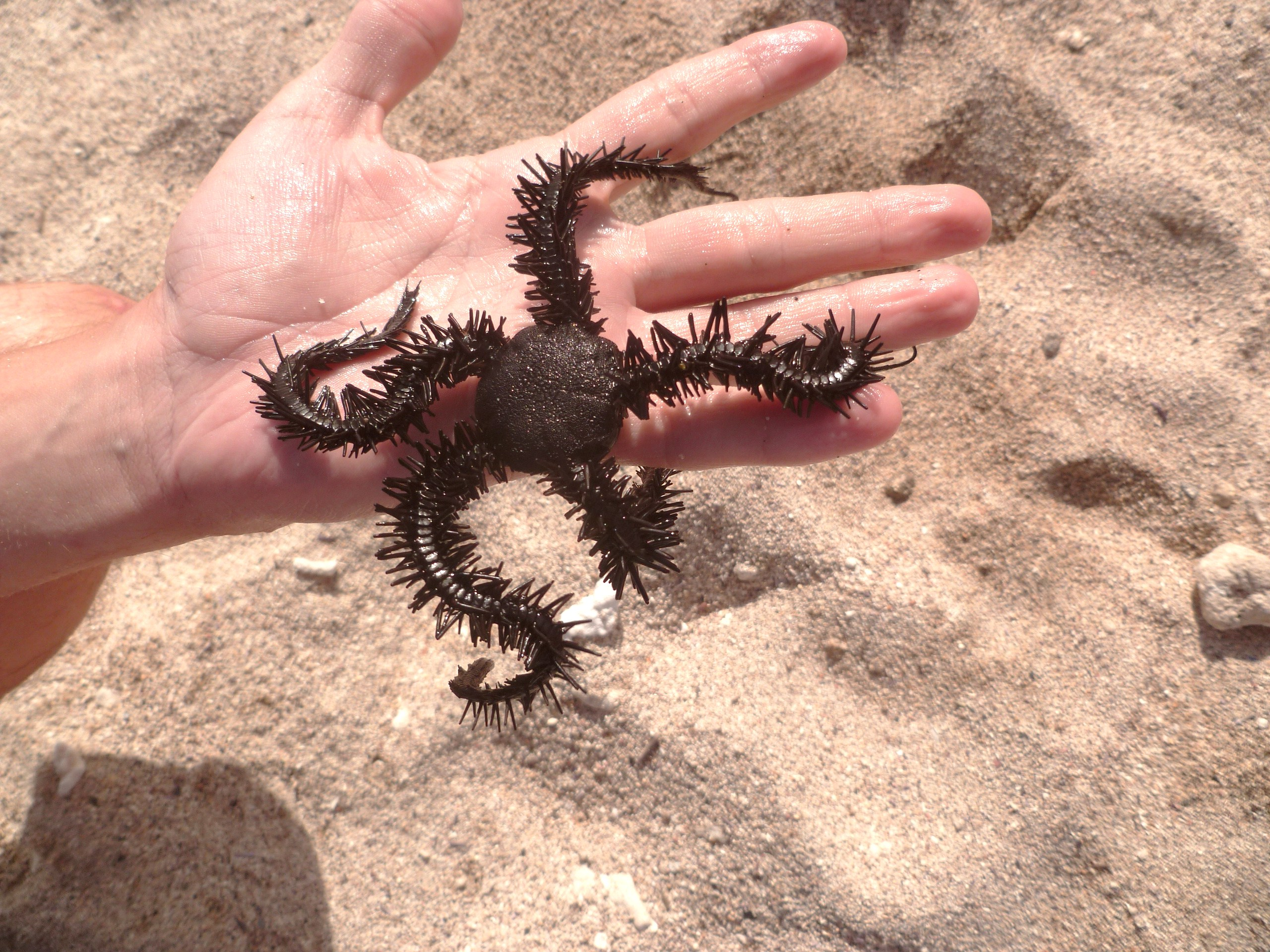
- Ophiocoma erinaceus

Scientific classification
- Kingdom: Animalia
- Phylum: Echinodermata
- Class: Ophiuroidea
- Superorder: Ophintegrida
- Order: Ophiacanthida; O'Hara, Hugall, Thuy, Stöhr & Martynov, 2017

Suborders
- Ophiacanthina; Ophiodermatina

= Ophiacanthida =

Ophiacanthida Temporal range: 330.3–0 Ma Lower Carboniferous to Present

Order of brittle stars

Ophiacanthida is an order of echinoderms belonging to the class Ophiuroidea. The earliest fossils of members from Ophiacanthida (Covidaster†) date back to the Serpukhovian in the Mississippian age (Lower Carboniferous). Fossils from this order have also been found dating to the Early Cretaceous (Late Aptian).

== Taxonomy ==
The order contains the following two suborders.

- Ophiacanthina O'Hara, Hugall, Thuy, Stöhr & Martynov, 2017
- Ophiodermatina Ljungman, 1867

There is also a family yet to be named which includes 20 genera.

- Ophiacanthida incertae sedis
  - Covidaster† Smith, Thuy, Sain & Sumrall, 2025
  - Microphiura Mortensen, 1910
  - Ophiacanthella Verrill, 1899
  - Ophiobrachion Lyman, 1883
  - Ophiochondrella Verrill, 1899
  - Ophioclastus Murakami, 1943
  - Ophiodaces Koehler, 1922
  - Ophiodelos Koehler, 1930
  - Ophiodyscrita H.L. Clark, 1938
  - Ophiogema Koehler, 1922
  - Ophiolamina Stöhr & Segonzac, 2006
  - Ophiomedea Koehler, 1906
  - Ophiomora Koehler, 1907
  - Ophioncus Ives, 1889
  - Ophiopaepale Ljungman, 1872
  - Ophioparva Guille, 1982
  - Ophiosciasma Lyman, 1878
  - Ophiostyracium H.L. Clark, 1911
  - Pectinura Forbes, 1843
  - Warenophis Stöhr, 2025

The phylogenetic tree per O'Hara et al. (2017) is as follows.

- Ophiacanthida
  - - Ophiacanthina
      - - - - - Ophiacanthidae
              - Clarkcomidae
            - Ophiopteridae
          - Ophiotomidae
        - Ophiocamacidae
      - Ophiobyrsidae
  - Ophiodermatina
    - - Ophiodermatoidea
        - - Ophiomyxidae
          - Ophiopezidae
        - Ophiodermatidae
      - Ophiocomoidea
        Ophiocomidae
