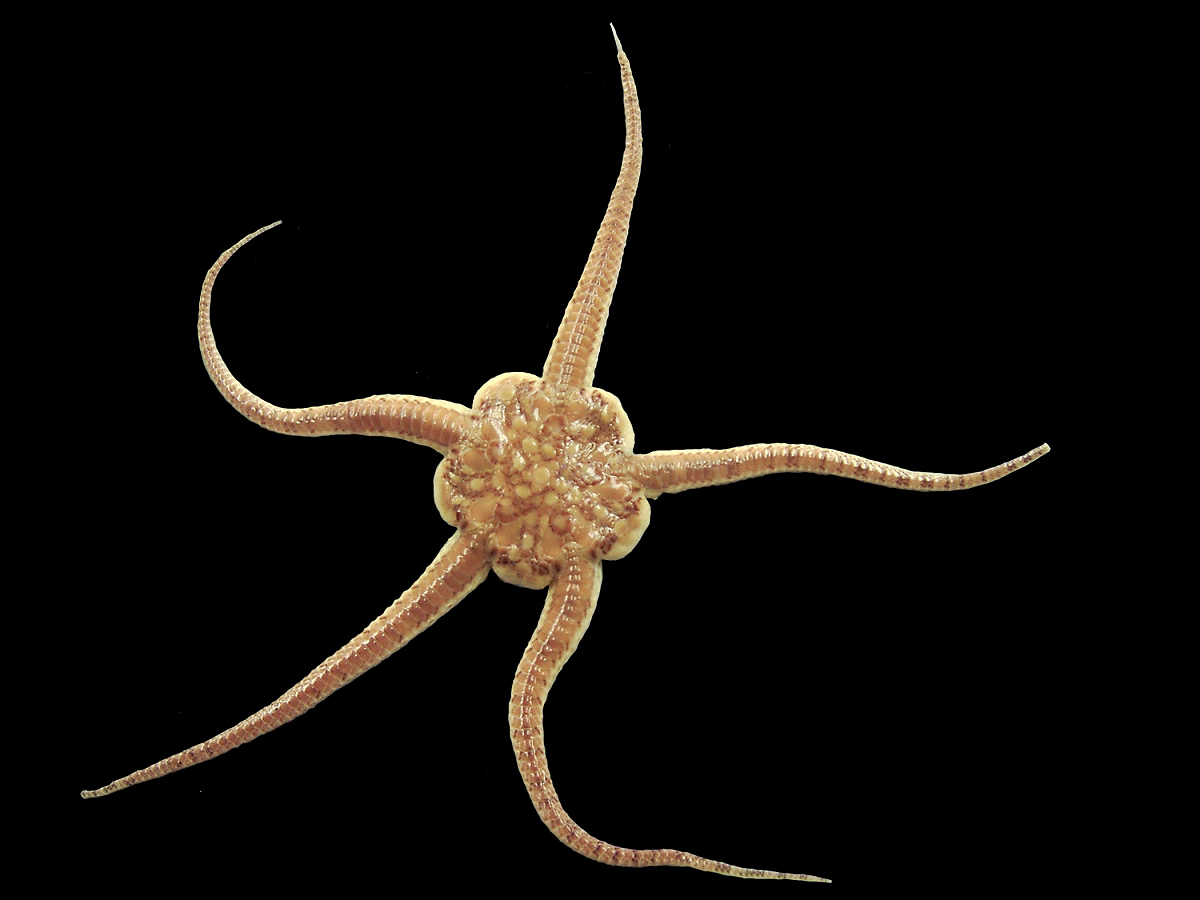
- Common brittlestar (Ophiura ophiura)

Scientific classification
- Kingdom: Animalia
- Phylum: Echinodermata
- Subphylum: Asterozoa
- Class: Ophiuroidea; Gray, 1840

Type species
- Ophiura ophiura Linnaeus, 1758

Child taxa
- Subclass Myophiuroida: Infraclass Metophiurida; Superorder Euryophiurida; Order Euryalida; Order Ophiurida; Superorder Ophintegrida; Order Amphilepidida; Order Ophiacanthida; Order Ophioleucida; Order Ophioscolecida

Diversity
- 2,159 species

= Brittle star =

Brittle star Temporal range: 469.4–0 Ma Early Ordovician to Present

Class of echinoderms

Brittle stars, serpent stars, or ophiuroids (from Latin ophiurus 'brittle star'; from Ancient Greek ὄφις (óphis) 'serpent' and οὐρά (ourá) 'tail'; referring to the serpent-like arms of the brittle star) are star-shaped echinoderms in the taxonomic class Ophiuroidea.

The Ophiuroidea contain two large clades, Ophiurida (brittle stars) and Euryalida (basket stars). Over 2,100 species of brittle stars spread across 256 recognized genera live today, making the class of Ophiuroidea the most diverse and abundant of all other classes of echinoderms. They are found from the tropics to the poles, from coastal shores to the hadal zone, with more than 1,200 of the species found in depths of greater than 200 m (656 ft). Despite their abundance, brittle stars have not been well-researched like their cousins, the Asteroidea (starfish). They play a vital role in marine ecosystems by enriching the environment.

Brittle stars crawl across the sea floor using their flexible arms for locomotion. They generally have a central disc with five long, slender, whip-like arms which range from mere millimeters to 60 cm (24 in) in length on the largest specimens. They come in a variety of color shades ranging from black, white, red, pink or blue to name a few and some species also have a pattern of two or more colors. Brittle stars can reproduce both sexual and asexually. They have the remarkable ability to regenerate lost or damaged arms and can also automotize their arms as a defense mechanism. They are mostly predators of benthic invertebrates. Fossil records of brittle stars date back to the Early Ordovician period around 469 million years ago. Unlike starfish, brittle stars are not used as a food source by humans.

== Anatomy ==
Anatomy of a brittle star

=== Digestion and Diet ===
The coelom in brittle stars is strongly reduced, particularly in comparison to other Echinoderms. Brittle stars have a single digestive opening, which is rimmed with five jaws on the oral surface. It serves both as a mouth (ingestion) and an anus (egestion). This opening expands into a sac-like stomach when the animal is feeding. Behind the jaws is a short esophagus and a stomach cavity which occupies much of the aboral half of the disc. Digestion occurs within 10 pouches or infolds of the stomach, which are essentially ceca, but unlike in Asteroidea (starfish), almost never extend into the arms and is thus confined to the disc. The stomach wall contains glandular hepatic cells.

Brittle stars are active predators of small crustaceans and worms, scavengers, suspension feeders, or detritivores. In large, crowded areas, brittle stars eat suspended matter from prevailing seabed currents. Many species in the family Ophiuridae are carnivores, such as Ophiura ophiura, which hunts epibenthic animals and the Antarctic Ophiosparte gigas, which is an active predator. Ophiura albida and Ophiura sarsii hunt infaunal prey and scavenge carrion and seabed organic matter. Ophionereis reticulata is an omnivore which feeds on algae, polychaetes and detritus. Ophiopsammus maculata consumes Nothofagus pollen in the New Zealand fjords (since those trees hang over the water). Members of the suborder Euryalids (basket stars) in particular are suspension feeders, using the mucus coating on their arms to trap plankton and bacteria and sweep food rhythmically to the mouth. Some basket stars cling to coral branches to feed on the polyps.

=== Musculoskeletal system ===
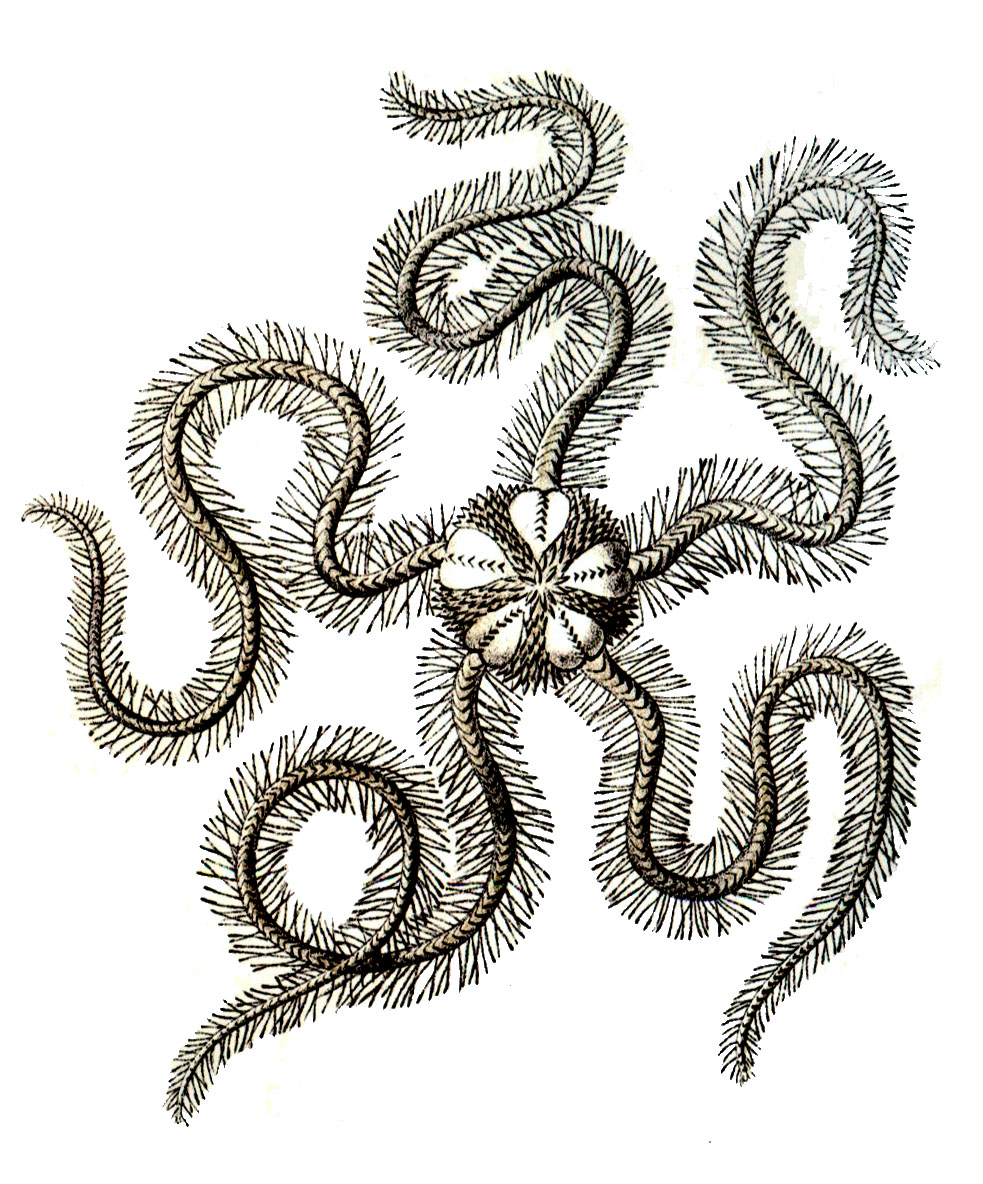
Drawing of (Ophiothrix fragilis) showing spines and articulated arms by Ernst Haeckel

A brittle star's skeleton is made up of embedded ossicles. Like all echinoderms, the brittle stars possess a skeleton of calcium carbonate in the form of calcite. In Ophiuroids, the calcite ossicles are fused to form armor plates which are known collectively as the test. The plates are covered by the epidermis, which consists of a smooth syncytium.

Unlike Asteroidea and five Paleozoic families of Ophiuroids with parallel ambulacral plates (grooves), the ambulacral plates in modern Ophiuroidea are fused together to form articulating vertebrae (ossicles). These occur along the median of the arm and are usually surrounded externally by four arm plates, one each on the ventral and dorsal surface, and two on the lateral surface of the arm. Spines are typically found projecting off the lateral arm plates. In Ophiuroids, the spines compose a rigid border to the arm edges, whereas in Euryalids, they are transformed into downward-facing clubs or hooks. The ossicles in Ophiuroids are also surrounded by a relatively thin ring of soft tissue and are linked by well-structured longitudinal skeletal muscles. Euryalids have bigger ossicles and smaller muscles.

==== Arms ====
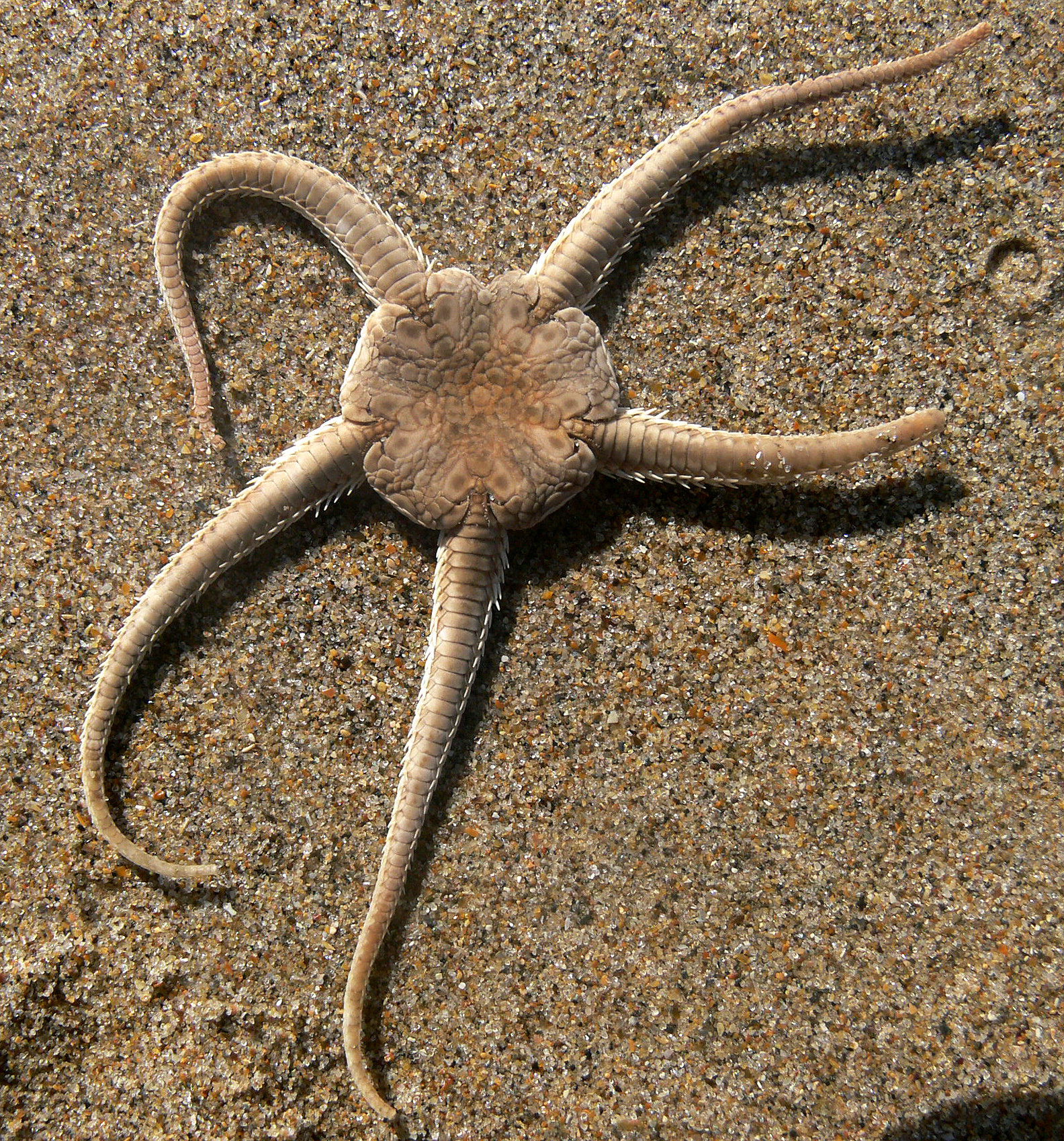
A Ophiura ophiura with a partly regenerated arm

Of all echinoderms, the Ophiuroidea (brittle stars) may have the strongest tendency toward five-segment radial (pentaradial) symmetry. The body outline is similar to that of Asteroidea, in that Ophiuroidea have five arms joined to a central body disc. However, in brittle stars, the arms are generally longer, more slender and laterally flexible, and the central body disc is sharply demarcated from the arms. Most members of this class have five arms, but some have been noted to have ten. The arms of Euryalids are either long and curling (snake stars) or branch out (basket stars). The length of the arm is usually many times that of the diameter of the disc. In most species of brittle stars, the joints between the ossicles and superficial plates allow the arm to bend to the side, but cannot bend upwards. However, in basket stars, the arms are flexible in all directions.

Brittle stars have the ability to cast off one or more arms as a defense mechanism, hence their common name is "brittle star". They can then regenerate lost arms or arm segments unless all arms are lost. The family Amphiuridae can also regenerate gut and gonad fragments lost along with the arms. Discarded arms have not been shown to have the ability to regenerate.

==== Disc ====
The disc contains all of the viscera, i.e, the internal organs. These organs of digestion and reproduction never enter the arms, as they do in the Asteroidea. The underside of the disc contains the mouth, which has five toothed jaws formed from skeletal plates. The disc diameters usually range from 3 mm in smaller species to 150 mm in the largest species of the basket stars.

=== Nervous system ===
The nervous system consists of a main nerve ring which runs around the central disc. At the base of each arm, the ring attaches to a radial nerve which runs to the end of the limb. The nerves in each limb run through a canal at the base of the vertebral ossicles. Most Ophiuroids have no eyes, or other specialised sense organs. However, they have several types of sensitive nerve endings in their epidermis, and are able to sense chemicals in the water, touch, and even the presence or absence of light.

=== Respiration ===
Gas exchange and excretion occur through cilia-lined sac called bursa (plural:bursae); each opens between the arm bases on the underside of the disc. Typically, ten bursae are found, and each fits between two stomach digestive pouches. Water flows through the bursae by means of cilia or muscular contraction. Oxygen is transported through the body by the hemal system, a series of sinuses and vessels distinct from the water vascular system. The bursae are probably also the main organs of excretion, with coelomocytes collecting waste products in the body cavity and then migrating to the bursae for expulsion from the body.

=== Water vascular system ===
Like other echinoderms, brittle stars also rely on the water vascular system for locomotion, food and waste transportation, and respiration. The entrance to the water vascular canal, the madreporite is usually located on the oral surface, on one of the jaw plates (oral shields), and not on the aboral surface as it is in the Asteroidea. The vessels of the water vascular system end in tube feet. Brittle stars generally have one madreporite, while basket stars, have one per arm on the aboral surface. Some have no madreporite at all.

== Reproduction ==
Brittle stars primarily reproduce sexually, and generally sexually mature in two to three years, become full grown in three to four years and live up to five years. The sexes are separate in most species, though a few species are hermaphroditic or protandric, most of these brood their offspring. The genital sacs of brittle stars lie inside a genital slit known as bursa, which is located on either side of each arm's base on the oral surface of the animal. An exception is the Ophiocanopidae, in which the genital sacs are instead paired in a chain along the basal arm joints. The bursae are generally restricted to the disc and serve as an outlet for gametes or a brood chamber for developing embryos. Fertilization is external in most species, with the gametes being shed into the surrounding water.

Many species brood developing larvae in the bursae, effectively giving birth to live young, while other species have a free-swimming larval form. Ophiopluteus is a feeding, planktonic larval form found only in brittle stars. These larvae have four pairs of rigid arms lined with cilia and develop directly into an adult, without the attachment stage found in most starfish larvae. The number of species exhibiting ophiopluteus larvae are fewer than those that directly develop. There are also other non-feeding larval forms, such as the reduced ophiopluteus, doliolaria, and barrel-shaped vitellaria. Larvae are bilaterally symmetrical and possess a complete digestive system, characteristics not retained in adults.

A select few brittle stars, such as Amphipholus squamata, are truly viviparous, with the embryo receiving nourishment from the mother through the wall of the bursa.

=== Fission ===
Asexual reproduction is rare in brittle stars and occurs mainly by fissiparity (division through fission). This happens when one individual becomes two by splitting its disc in half. Fissiparous species are often six-armed, such as members of the family Ophiactidae. Regrowth of both the lost part of the disc and the arms occur which yields an animal with three large arms and three small arms during the period of growth.

The West Indian brittle star, Ophiocomella ophiactoides, frequently undergoes fissiparity. In both summer and winter, large numbers of individuals with three long arms and three short arms can be found, while other individuals have half a disc and only three arms. A study of the age range of the population indicated little recruitment and that fission is the primary means of reproduction in this species. Fission appears to start with the softening of one side of the disc and the initiation of a furrow which deepens and widens until it extends across the disc and the animal splits in two. New arms begin to grow before the fission is complete, thus minimizing the time between possible successive divisions. The plane of fission varies so that some newly formed individuals have existing arms of different lengths. The time period between successive divisions was noted to be 89 days, so theoretically, each brittle star can produce 15 new individuals during the course of a year.

== Locomotion ==
Brittle star in motion

Brittle stars use their arms for locomotion. Brittle stars move fairly rapidly by wriggling their arms which are highly flexible and enable the animals to make either snake-like or rowing movements. However, they tend to attach themselves to the sea floor or to sponges or cnidarians, such as coral. They move as if they were bilaterally symmetrical, with an arbitrary leg selected as the symmetry axis and the other four used in propulsion. The axial leg may be facing or trailing the direction of motion, and due to the radially symmetrical nervous system, can be changed whenever a change in direction is necessary.

== Bioluminescence ==
Bioluminescence observed in Ophiopsila polyacantha (video)

A number of brittle star species are photosensitive, having the ability to rapidly respond to light and also change color. Research has shown that certain calcite arm ossicles are arranged into microlenses and are used as photoreceptors. A total of 77 of the 220 tested brittle star species from every type of biotope are known to be bioluminescent, representing over half of all bioluminescent echinoderms known and thus making Ophiuroidea the dominant class of luminous echinoderms. Most of these species produce light in the green wavelengths, although four blue-emitting deep-sea species have been discovered.

Species of the genus Ophiopsila are known to produce strongest intensity of light. Examples of bioluminiscent species from this genus are Ophiopsila aranea, Ophiopsila californica and Ophiopsila riisei among others. Pigmentation in individuals of the same species of brittle stars, such as Amphilpholis squamata, has been noted to affect their bioluminescence capability. Bioluminescence can occur in entire body or only in certain parts, like only arms in A. squamata. It has been observed that bioluminescence varies in intensity along same body part with regard to pigmentation, such as dark-colored arm segments producing weaker light than light-colored ones. Intensity also varies with arm length. In A. squamata, intensity of bioluminescence varies with the reproductive cycle, i,e, whether the individual is brooding or not. Brooding individuals have been observed to emit light of more intensity than non-brooding ones.

Brittle stars typically emit short and intense flashes of light after being disturbed as a defense mechansim against predators or warning predators against their toxicity. Bioluminescence is sometimes also used as a means for a sacrificial lure (when associated with an autotomized arm).

Some brittle stars are capable of bioluminescence via photocytes under nervous control. The arms of Amphiura filiformis, are covered with spines containing photocytes. Light produced by brittle stars for bioluminescence is diffused and restricted to dense areas of photocytes. Ophiocomina nigra, is known to produce a mucus at the arm level of weak luminous intensities when attacked. No members of the suborder Euryalida (basket stars or snake stars) are known to be bioluminescent.

== Ecology ==
=== Distribution ===
Ophiuroids can be found in all of the major marine environments, from the poles to the tropics at all depths. They have also been discovered in the tropical anchialine caves. Basket stars are usually confined to the deeper parts of this range; Ophiuroids are known even from abyssal depths (>6,000 m). They are also common members of reef communities, where they hide under rocks and even within other living organisms. A few ophiuroid species can also tolerate brackish water, an ability otherwise almost unknown among echinoderms.

Brittle stars live in areas from the low-tide level downwards. Six families live at least 2 m deep; the genera Ophiura, Amphiophiura, and Ophiacantha range below 4 m. Shallow species live among sponges, stones, or coral, or under the sand or mud, with only their arms protruding. Two of the best-known shallow species are the green brittle star (Ophioderma brevispina), found from Massachusetts to Brazil, and the common European brittle star (Ophiothrix fragilis). Deep-water species tend to live in or on the sea floor or adhere to coral, urchins, or xenophyophores. The most widespread species is the long-armed brittle star (Amphipholis squamata), a grayish or bluish, strongly luminescent species.

=== Parasites ===
The main parasites to enter the digestive tract or genitals are protozoans, but crustaceans, nematodes, trematodes, and polychaete annelids also serve as parasites. Algal parasites such as Coccomyxa ophiurae cause spinal malformation. Unlike in sea stars and sea urchins, annelids are not typical parasites.

== Evolution ==
=== Fossil record ===
Johann Friedrich Blumenbach described the first fossil ophiuroid in 1804, Aspiduriella scutellata†. There are 325 recognized fossil species of brittle stars. Study of past distribution and evolution of brittle stars has been hampered by the tendency of dead brittle stars to disarticulate and scatter, providing poor brittle star fossils. Until discoveries in the Agrio Formation of Neuquén Basin in the 2010s no fossil brittle star was known in the Southern Hemisphere, nor was any brittle star of Cretaceous age known. Complete and articulated fossils of ophiuroids have been reported from all major intervals of post-Cambrian period but are rather rare compared to the microfossils of isolated (dissociated) ophiuroid ossicles in palaeo-sediments. Many of these are distinct enough to be utilized for phylogenetic research, however, there has been a lack of effort to incorporate these fossils into modern phylogenetic schemes.

The earliest known ophiuroid fossils date from the Early Ordovician. Brittle stars from the early to mid Paleozoic era are placed in the extinct order Oegophiurida and differ significantly to the modern brittle stars, in that they had an open ambulacral groove and unfused ambulacral plates just like modern starfish. However, these ancient brittle stars did have a distinct central disc, jaw structure, general vertebrae characteristics and presence of a dental plate just like their modern descendants. Research has indicated that brittle stars underwent a radiation in the late Paleozoic to early Mesozoic eras. The origin of modern families can be traced back to the late Mesozoic era. The eraliest fossils of modern euryalid families date to the middle Miocene.

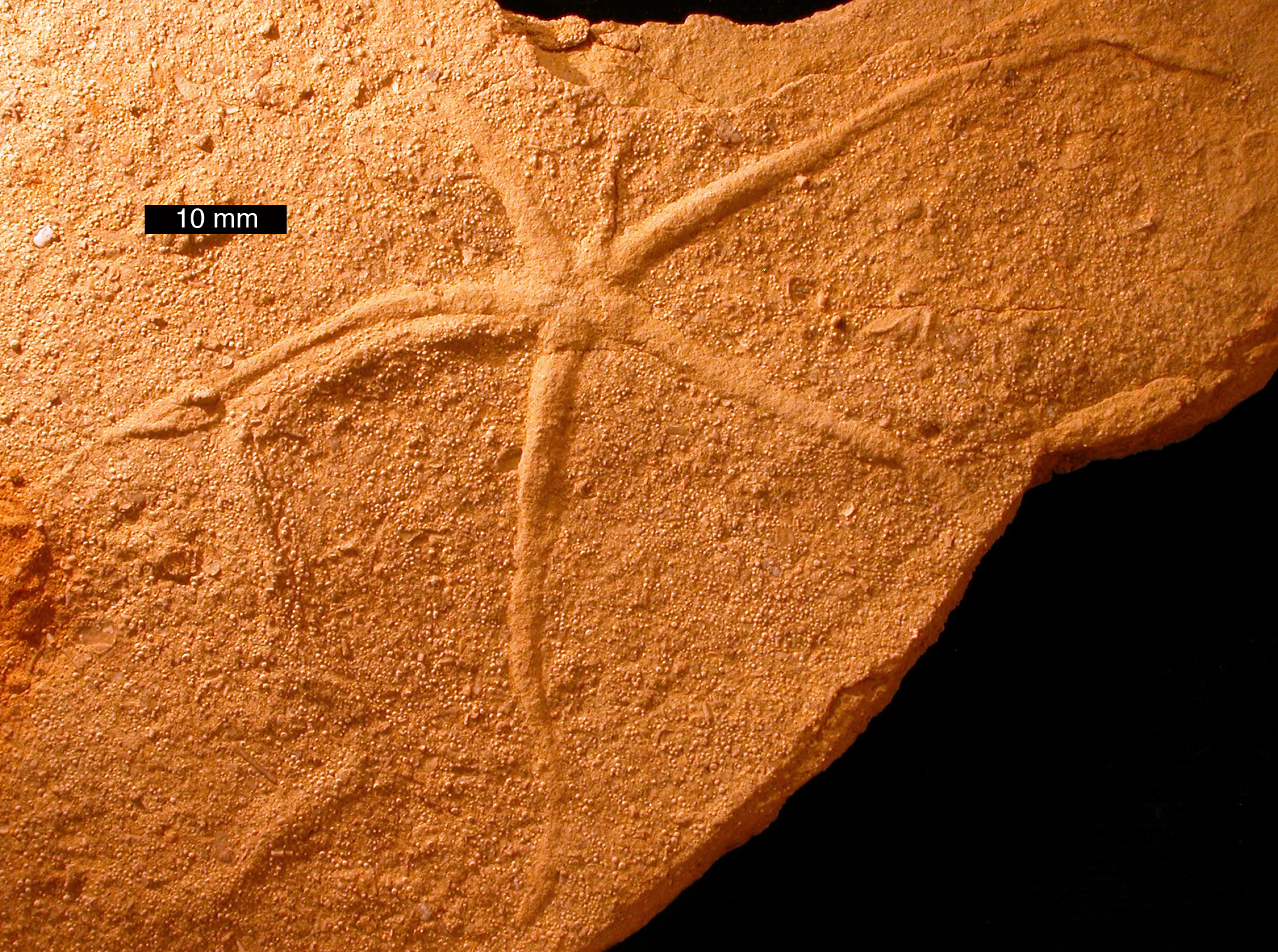
Asteriacites, a trace fossil of an ophiuroid; Carmel Formation (Middle Jurassic), near Gunlock, USA

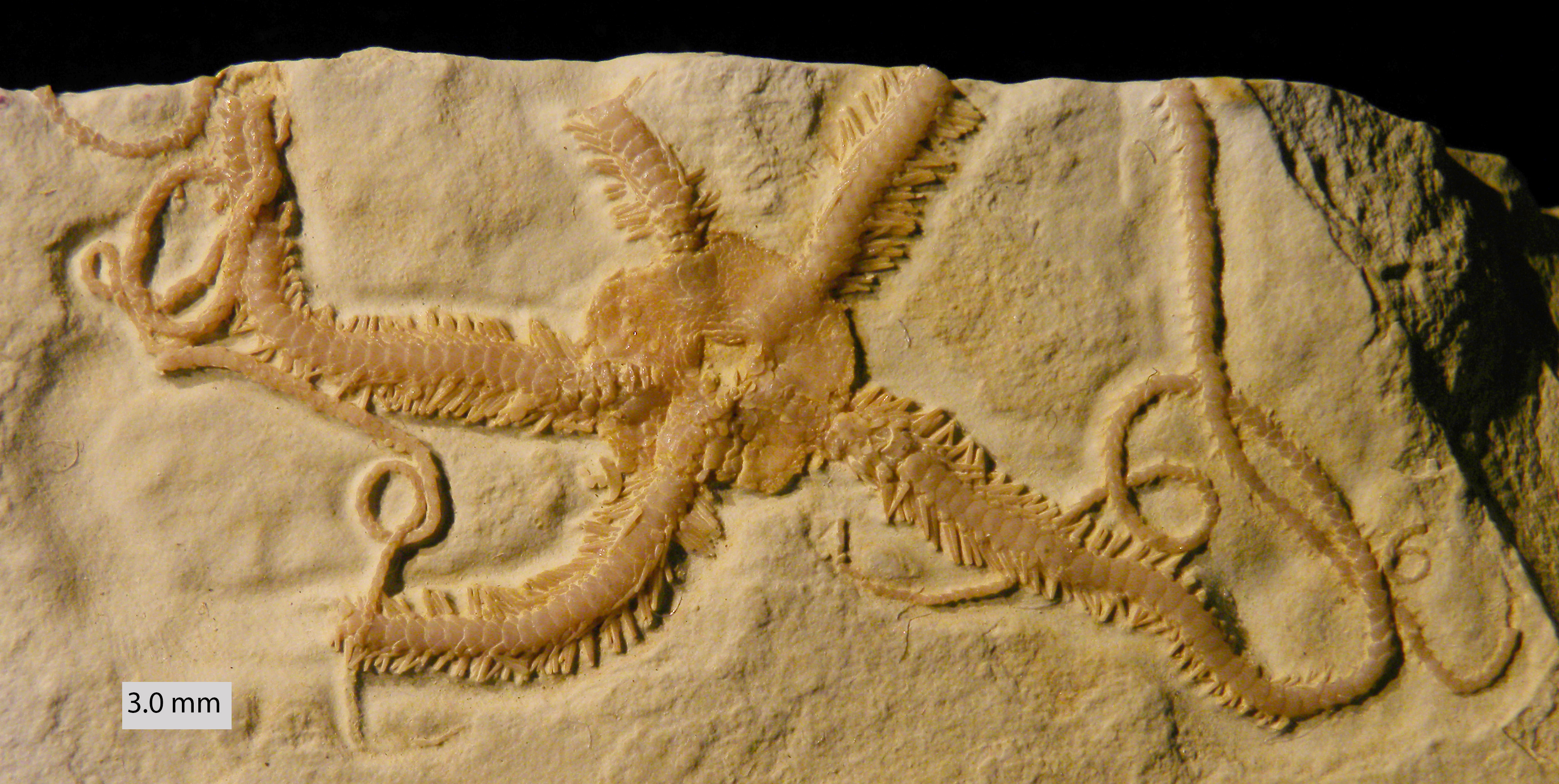
Ophiopetra lithographica from the Lower Hienheim Beds (Lower Tithonian, Late Jurassic) near Regensburg, Germany

Fossil brittle stars from Ophiocrossota genus in fossiliferous sandy limestone from the Miocene, California, USA.

Silurian fossils from a minor mass extinction called the Mulde event show the ancestors of modern brittle stars went through a bottleneck, where a miniaturization caused by paedomorphosis led to structural simplification of their skeletal anatomy. These traits affected their further evolution. As they began to increase in size again, so did their complexity. The first large-sized modern brittle star originated in the Early Carboniferous.

=== Phylogeny ===
==== External ====
The extant echinoderms consist of the Crinoidea and the Eleutherozoa, the latter of which is divided into the Echinozoa and the Asterozoa. Brittle stars (Ophiuroidea) belong to subphylum Asterozoa along with Starfish (Asteroidea). The extrnal cladogram is as follows.

- Echinodermata
  - Crinoidea
  - Eleutherozoa
    - Echinozoa
      - Holothuroidea
      - Echinoidea
    - Asterozoa
      - Ophiuroidea c. 480 mya
      - Asteroidea

==== Internal ====
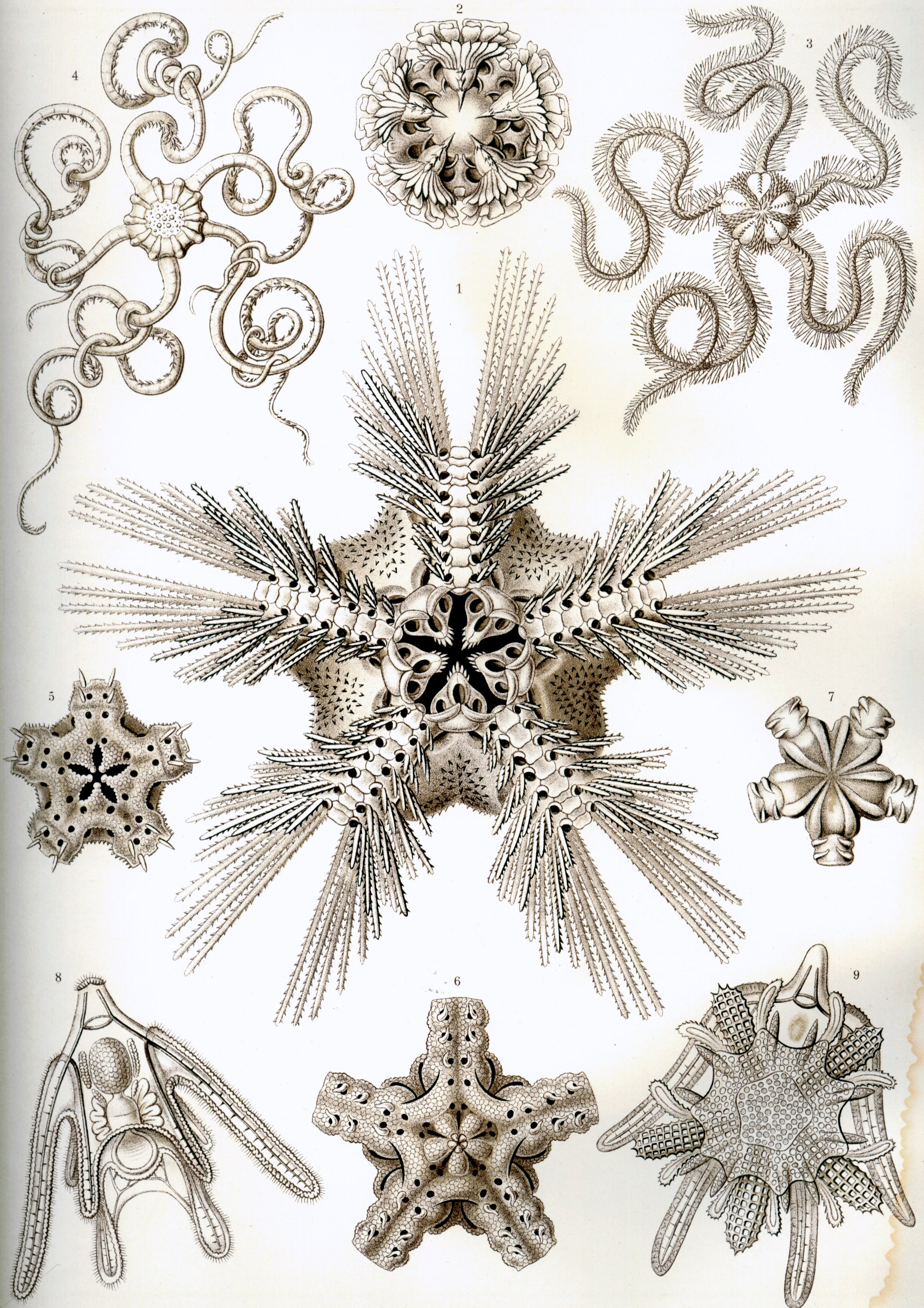
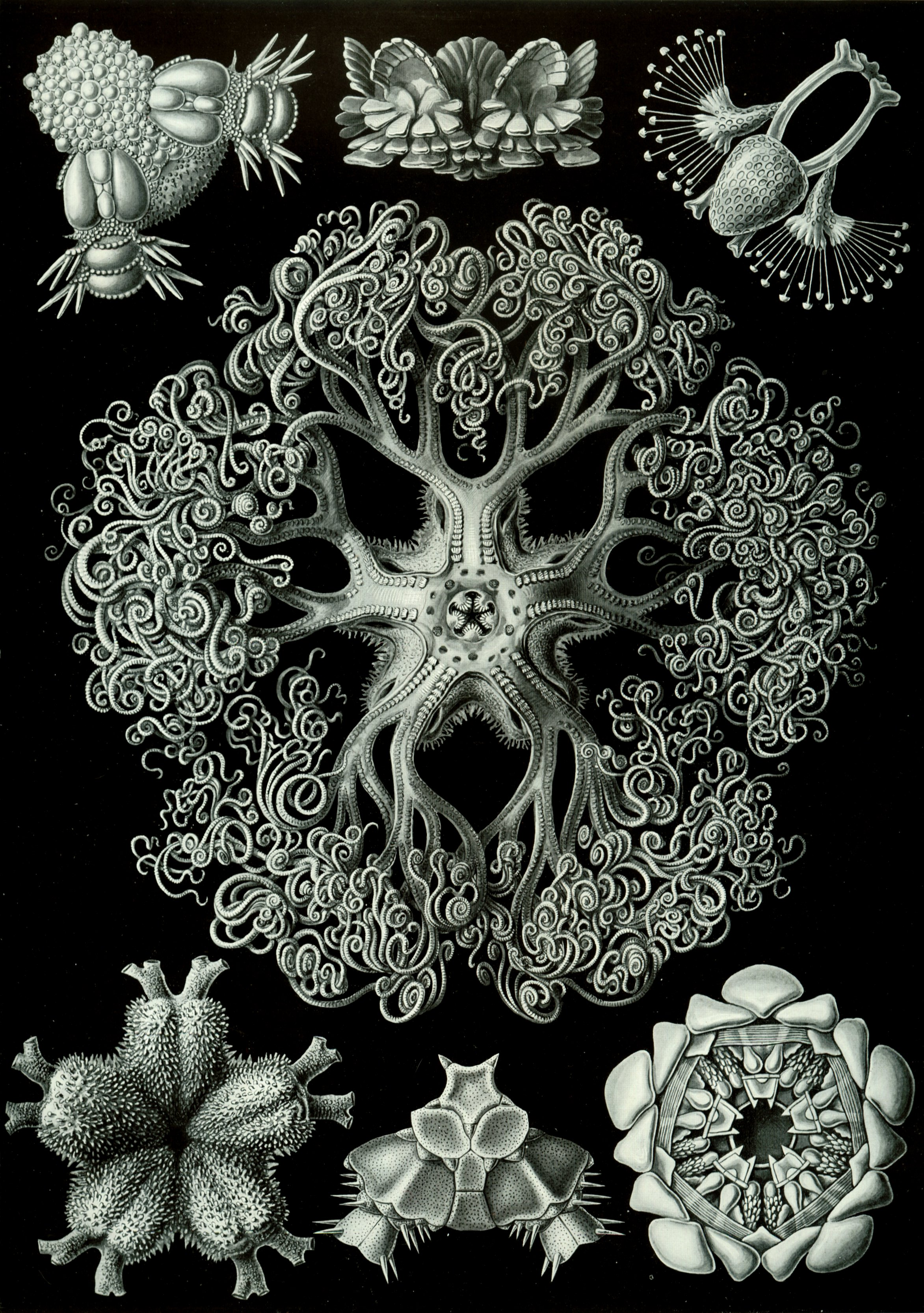
Brittle stars from the Kunstformen der Natur by Ernst Haeckel (1904)

There are 2,159 recognized species of brittle stars as of October 2026, but the total number of modern species may be over 3,000. This makes Ophiuroidea class the most abundant class of all other classes of echinoderms. There are currently 256 recognized genera. The phylogeny and taxonomy of brittle stars suffers from a lack of detailed research. New scientific advances and re-evalaution of established taxonomy in use for the past century have led to a major overhaul of ophiuroid classification at the family level and above. Current schemes and phylogenies rely heavily on the components of the external skeletal system of brittle stars. This can be problematic as the brittle star skeleton also includes various internal components which can vary greatly and also need to be taken into account when proposing new classification systems. The first classification system of brittle stars was proposed by Müller and Troschell in 1840, who classified brittle stars into two-division system of Euryalae, for all brittle stars with branching and/or vertically coiling arms and Ophiurae, for all others. This system was overhauled by Matsumoto in 1915 when he proposed a four-division system based on morphological differences, those being, presence/absence of dorsal arm plates, articulation of the genital and radial shields and shape of the vertebrae. These four divisions were Phrynophiurida, Laemophiurida, Gnathophiurida and Chilophiurida. This scheme largely persisted until it was modified by Spencer and Wright (1966). More recent studies favor a two-division system of Euryalida (=Euryalae sensu stricto) and Ophiurida (=Ophiurae).

A comprehensive and at the time only phylogenetic study of brittle stars was undertaken by Smith et al. in 1995. It supported a portion of previously established relationships by morphological or molecular data. A study by Okanishi et al. (2011) confirmed the monophyly of the orders of Euryalida and Ophiurida.

In 2014, O’Hara et al. conducted a landmark phylogenomic study and constructed a phylogeny of brittle stars for the first time. In 2017, O'Hara et al. conducted a study using broad-scale phylogenomics with the goal of determining phylogeny of families and higher taxa of the class Ophiuroidea. The researchers examined 576 species of the class and 1,484 exon using latest phylogenetic methods and models. They propose a total of six orders comprising six tribes and five superfamilies. The superfamilies consist of 33 families, which is double the number of the previously established 16 families. This is currently the most comprehensive phylogenetic study of extant brittle stars. The Ophiuroidea phylogenetic tree per O'Hara et al. (2017) is as follows.

- Ophiuroidea
  - Ophintegrida
    - - Amphilepidida
        - - Gnathophiurina
            - - - Ophiactoidea
                  - - - Ophiotrichidae
                      - Ophiopholidae
                    - - Ophiactidae
                  - - Ophiothamnidae
            - Amphiuroidea
              - Amphiuridae
              - Amphilepididae
          - Ophiopsilina Ophiopsiloidea
            - Ophiopsilidae
        - Ophionereidina
          - Ophionereidoidea
            - Ophionereididae
            - Amphilimnidae
          - Ophiolepidoidea
            - Hemieuryalidae
            - Ophiolepididae
      - Ophioleucida
        - Ophioleucidae
        - Ophiernidae
    - - Ophiacanthida
        - - Ophiacanthina
            - - - - - Ophiacanthidae
                    - Clarkcomidae
                  - Ophiopteridae
                - Ophiotomidae
              - Ophiocamacidae
            - Ophiobyrsidae
        - Ophiodermatina
          - - Ophiodermatoidea
              - - Ophiomyxidae
                - Ophiopezidae
              - Ophiodermatidae
            - Ophiocomoidea
              Ophiocomidae
      - Ophioscolecida
        - Ophioscolecidae
        - Ophiohelidae
  - Euryophiurida
    - - - Ophiurida
          - Ophiurina
            - - Ophiopyrgidae
              - Ophiuridae
            - Astrophiuridae
          - Ophiomusina
            - Ophiomusaidae
            - Ophiosphalmidae
    - Euryalida (Basket stars)
      - - Gorgonocephalidae
        - Euryalidae
      - Asteronychidae

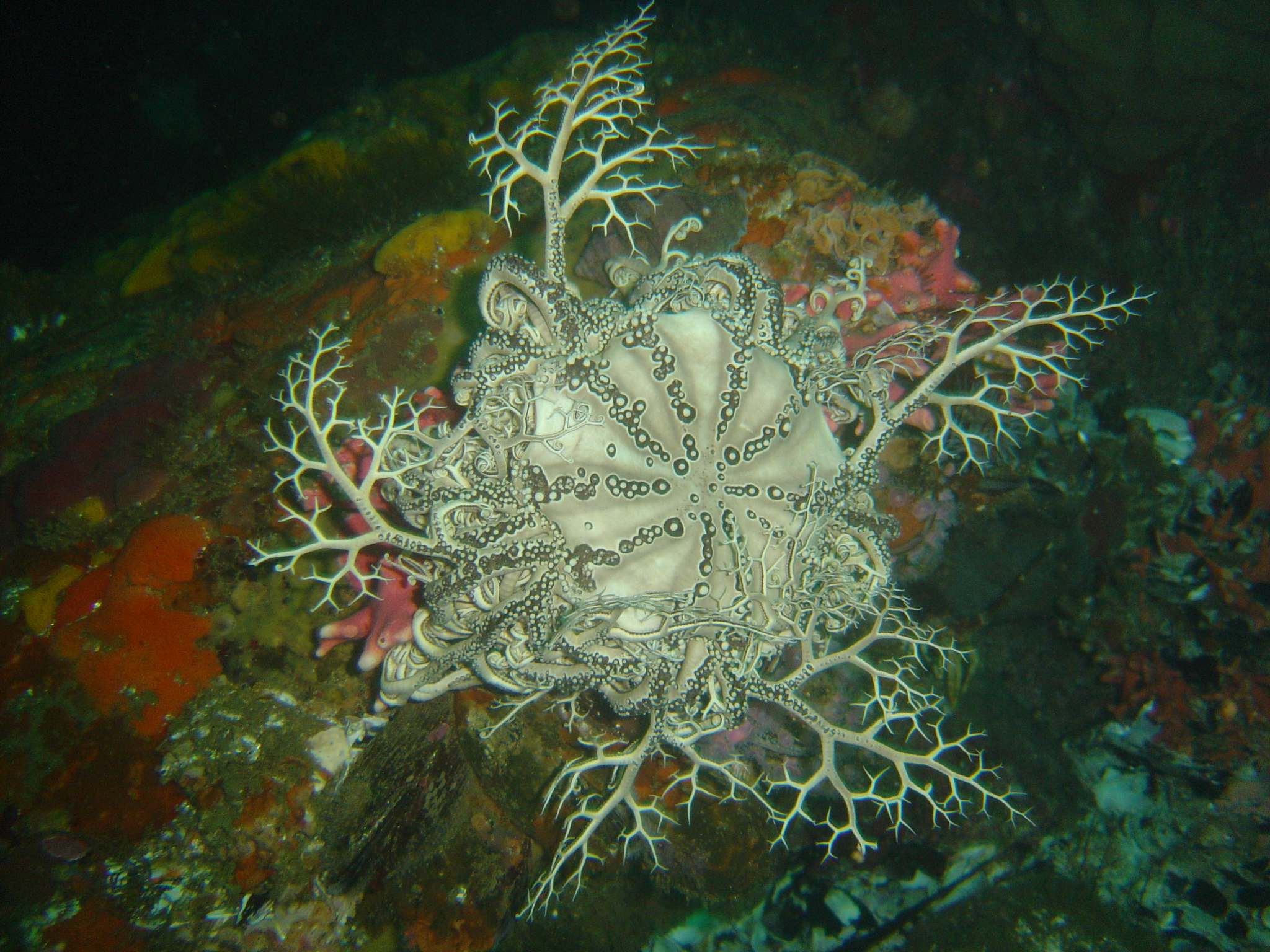
Astrocladus euryale
(Gorgonocephalidae)

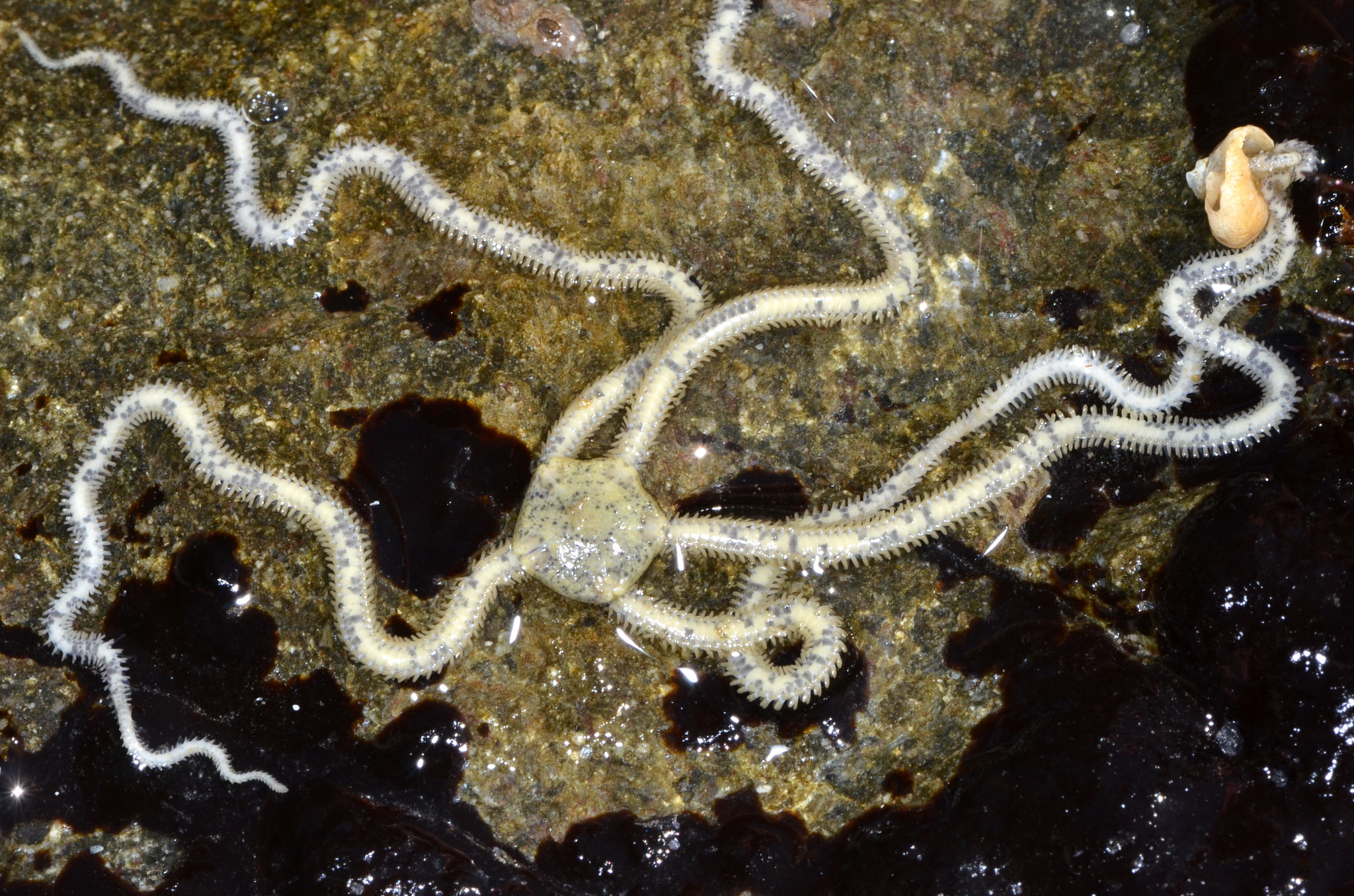
Amphiodia occidentalis
(Amphiuridae)

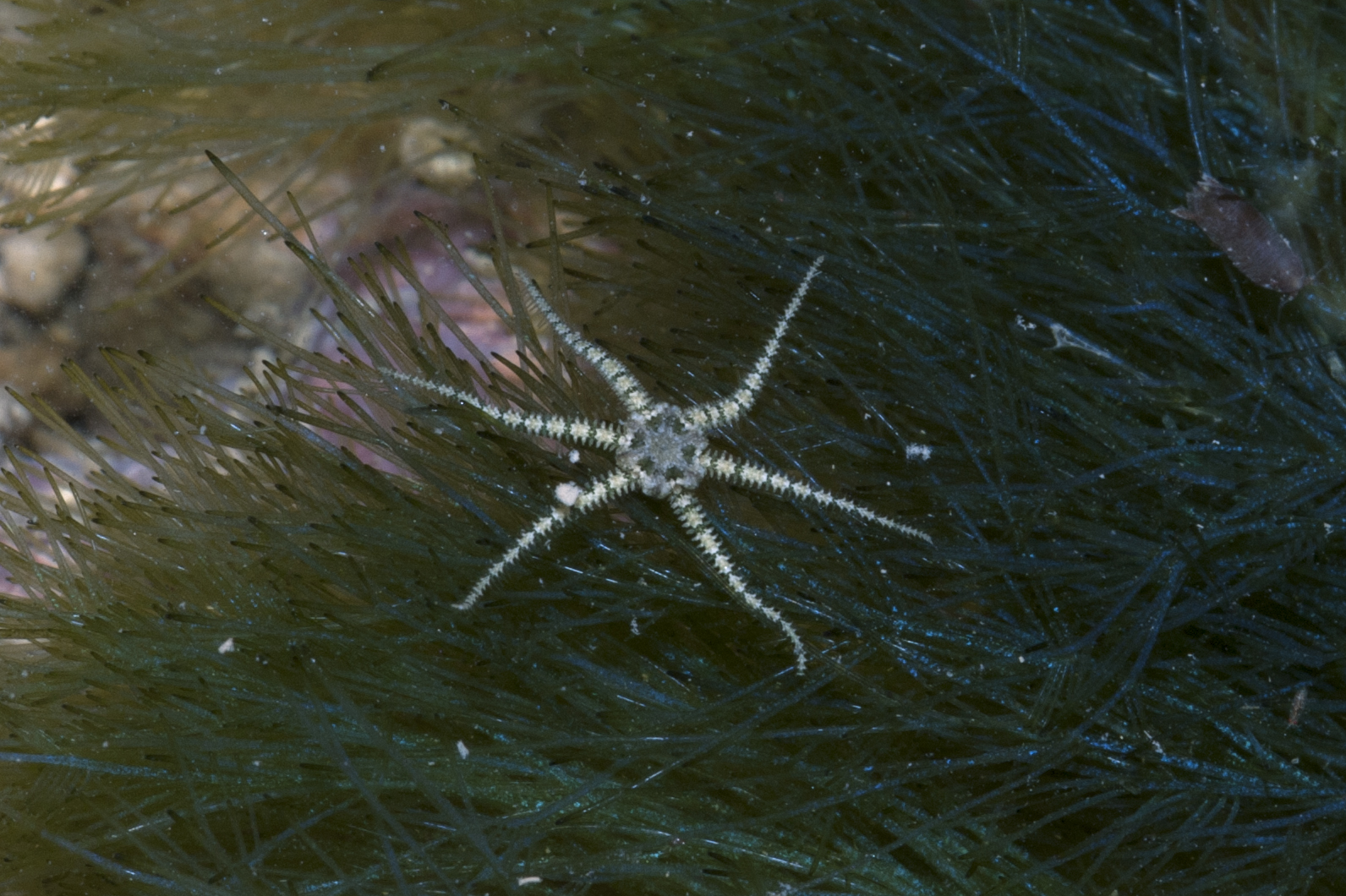
Ophiactis savignyi
(Ophiactidae)

Ophiocoma scolopendrina
(Ophiocomidae)

Ophiocomina nigra
(Ophiotomidae)

Macrophiothrix demessa
(Ophiotrichidae)

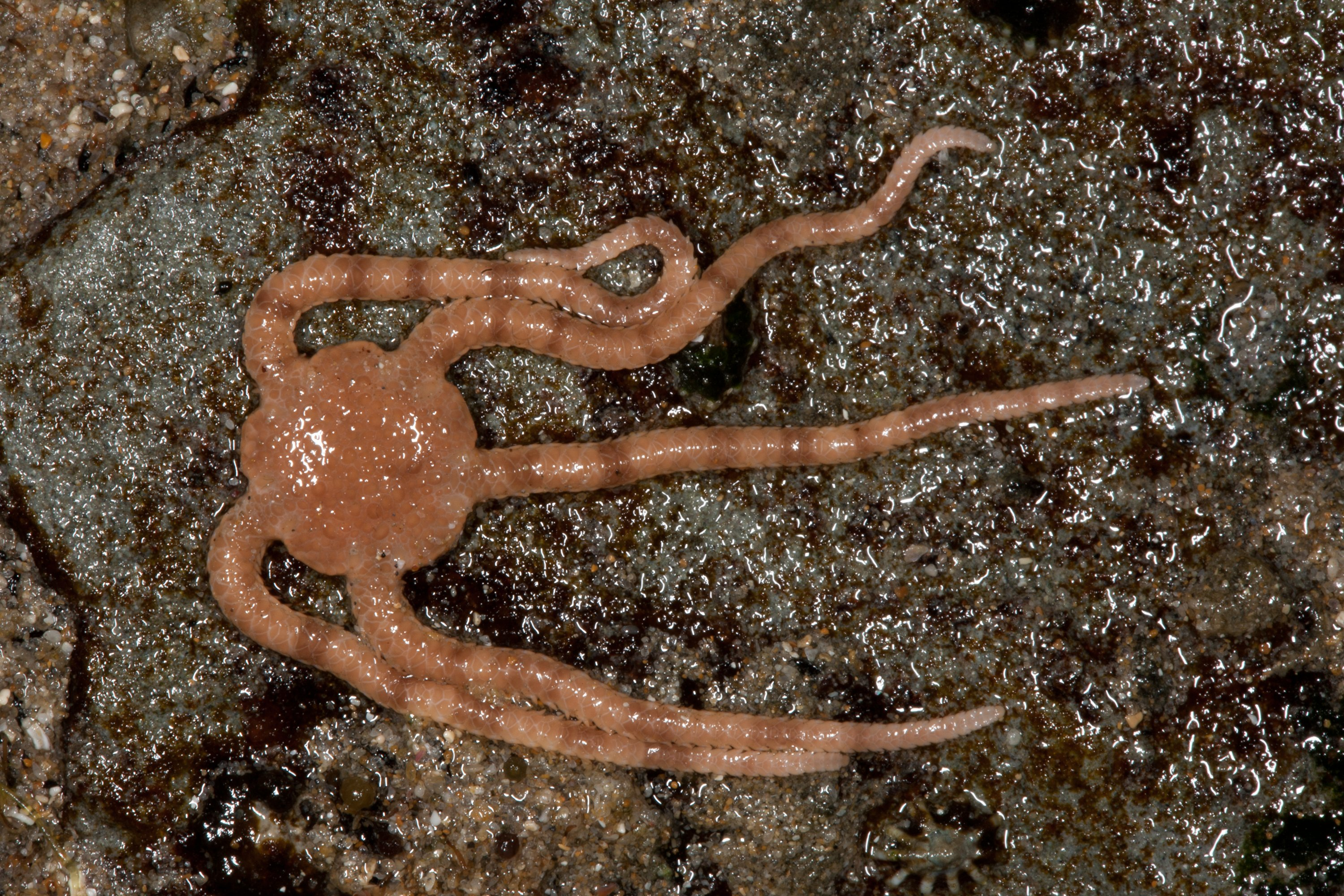
Ophioplocus bispinosa
(Hemieuryalidae)

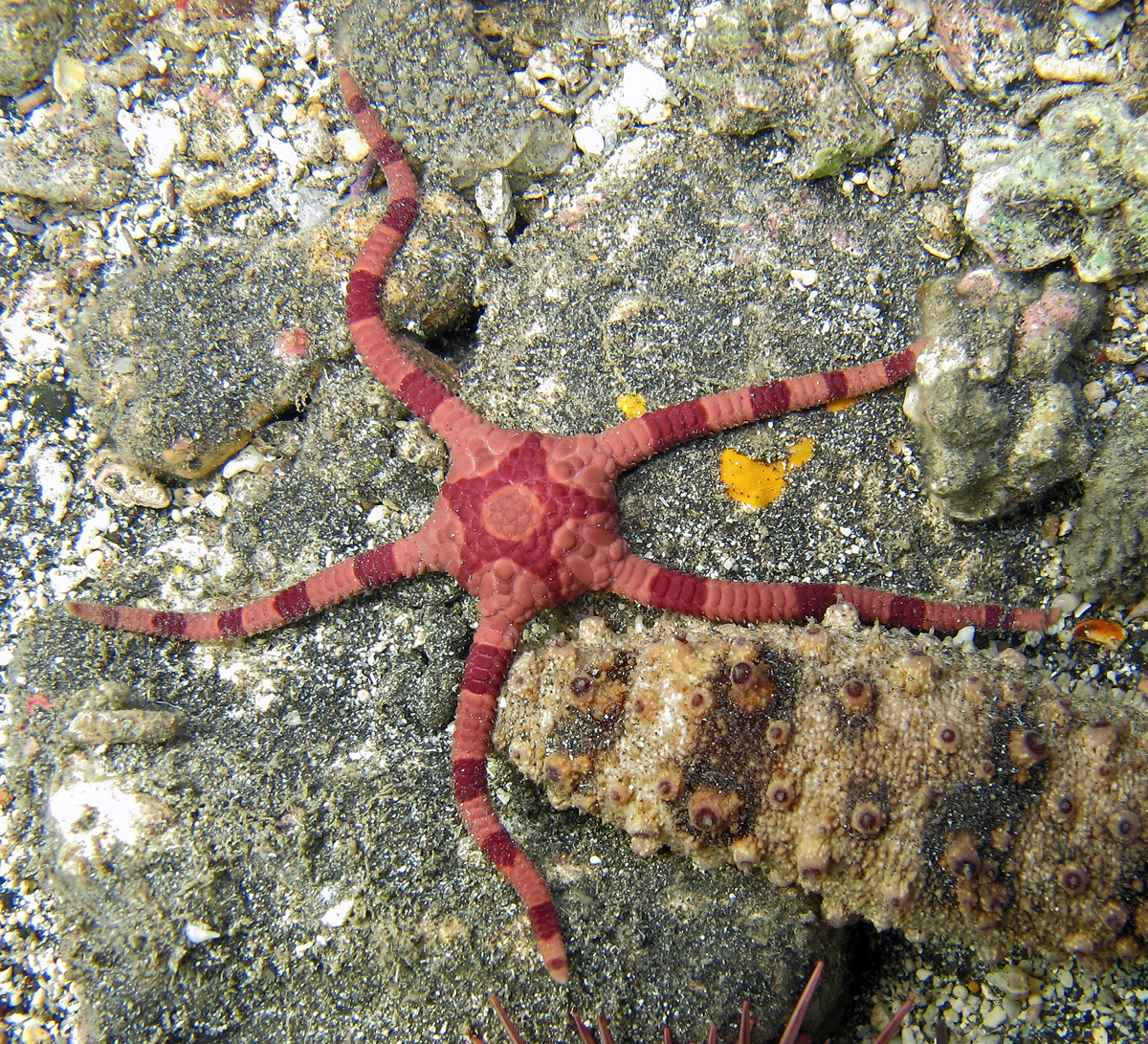
Ophiolepis superba
(Ophiolepididae)

== Relations to humans ==
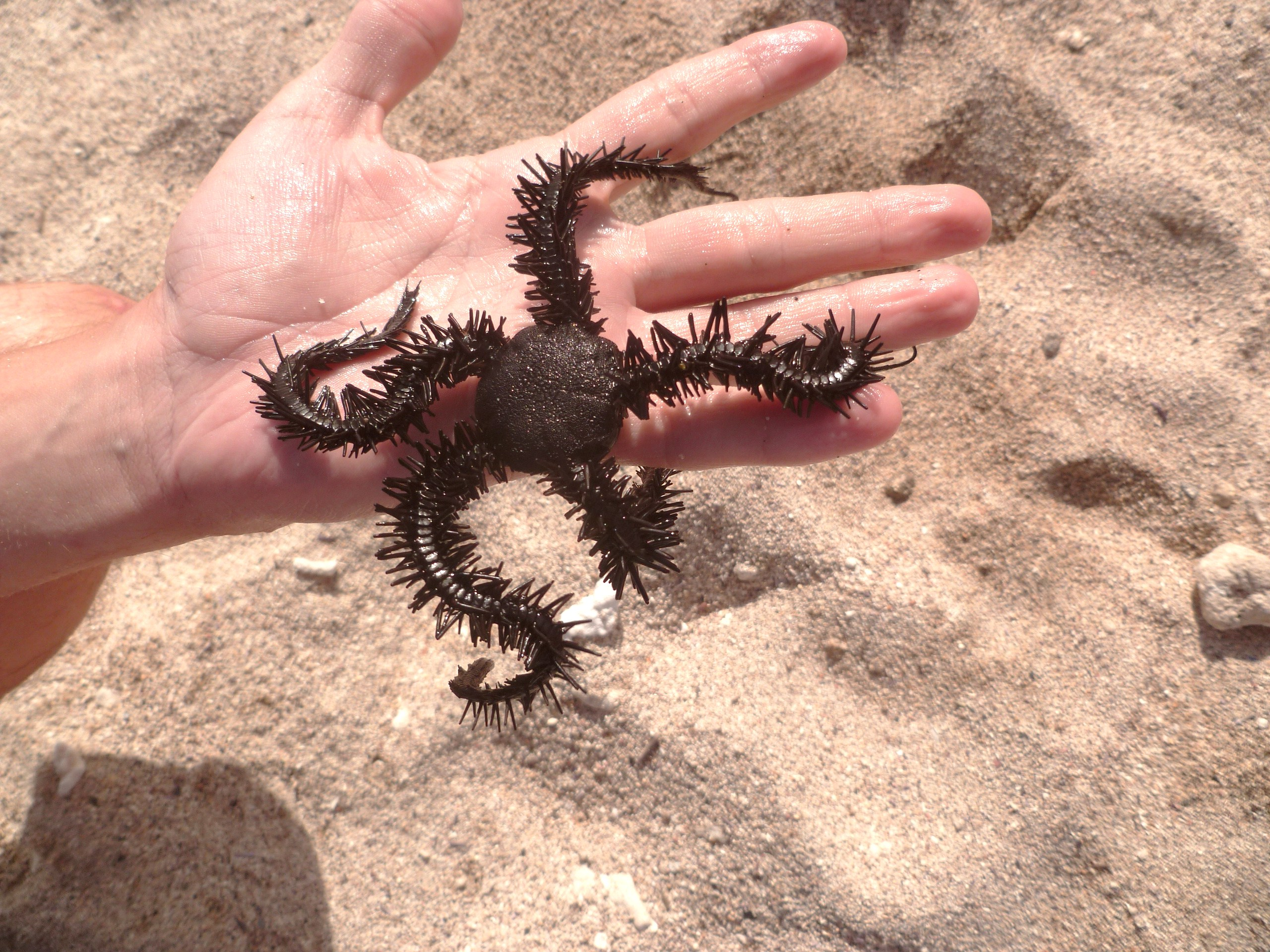
Tropical black brittlestar (Ophiocoma erinaceus) held in hand

Brittle stars are not used as food, though they are not toxic, because of their strong skeleton. Even if some species have blunt spines, no brittle star is known to be dangerous, nor venomous. The brittle star's only means of defense are crawling or discarding an arm. However, brittle stars do hunt small crustaceans.

=== Aquaria ===
Brittle stars are a moderately popular invertebrate in fishkeeping. They can easily thrive in marine tanks. The micro brittle star is usually described to be a common "hitchhiker" that will propagate in almost any saltwater tank containing live rocks. Larger brittle stars are popular because, unlike Asteroidea, they are not generally seen as a threat to coral and are also faster moving and more active than Asteroidea.

== Sources ==
- Escriva, Hector; Reich, Adrian; Dunn, Casey; Akasaka, Koji; Wessel, Gary (2015). "Phylogenomic Analyses of Echinodermata Support the Sister Groups of Asterozoa and Echinozoa". PLOS ONE. 10 (3) e0119627. Bibcode:2015PLoSO..1019627R. doi:10.1371/journal.pone.0119627. ISSN 1932-6203. PMC 4368666. PMID 25794146.
- David L. Pawson, Andrew C. Campbell, David L. Pawson, David L. Pawson, Raymond C. Moore, J. John Sepkoski, Jr., "Echinodermata", in AccessScience@McGraw-Hill, http://www.accessscience.com, DOI 10.1036/1097-8542.210700
- Andrew B. Smith, Howard B. Fell, Daniel B. Blake, Howard B. Fell, "Ophiuroidea", in AccessScience@McGraw-Hill, http://www.accessscience.com, DOI 10.1036/1097-8542.471000
- Telford, M. J.; Lowe, C. J.; Cameron, C. B.; Ortega-Martinez, O.; Aronowicz, J.; Oliveri, P.; Copley, R. R. (2014). "Phylogenomic analysis of echinoderm class relationships supports Asterozoa". Proceedings of the Royal Society B: Biological Sciences. 281 (1786) 20140479. doi:10.1098/rspb.2014.0479. PMC 4046411. PMID 24850925.
- "brittle star."Encyclopædia Britannica. 2008. Encyclopædia Britannica 2006 Ultimate Reference Suite DVD 17 June 2008.
- Palaeos: Ophiuroidea
- Brittlestars on wetwebmedia.com
