= List of prehistoric brittle stars =

This list of prehistoric brittle stars is an attempt to create a comprehensive listing of all genera from the fossil record that have ever been considered to be ophiuroids, excluding purely vernacular terms. The list includes all commonly accepted genera, but also genera that are now considered invalid, doubtful (nomina dubia), or were not formally published (nomina nuda), as well as junior synonyms of more established names, and genera that are no longer considered brittle stars.

== List ==
† denotes extinct genus.

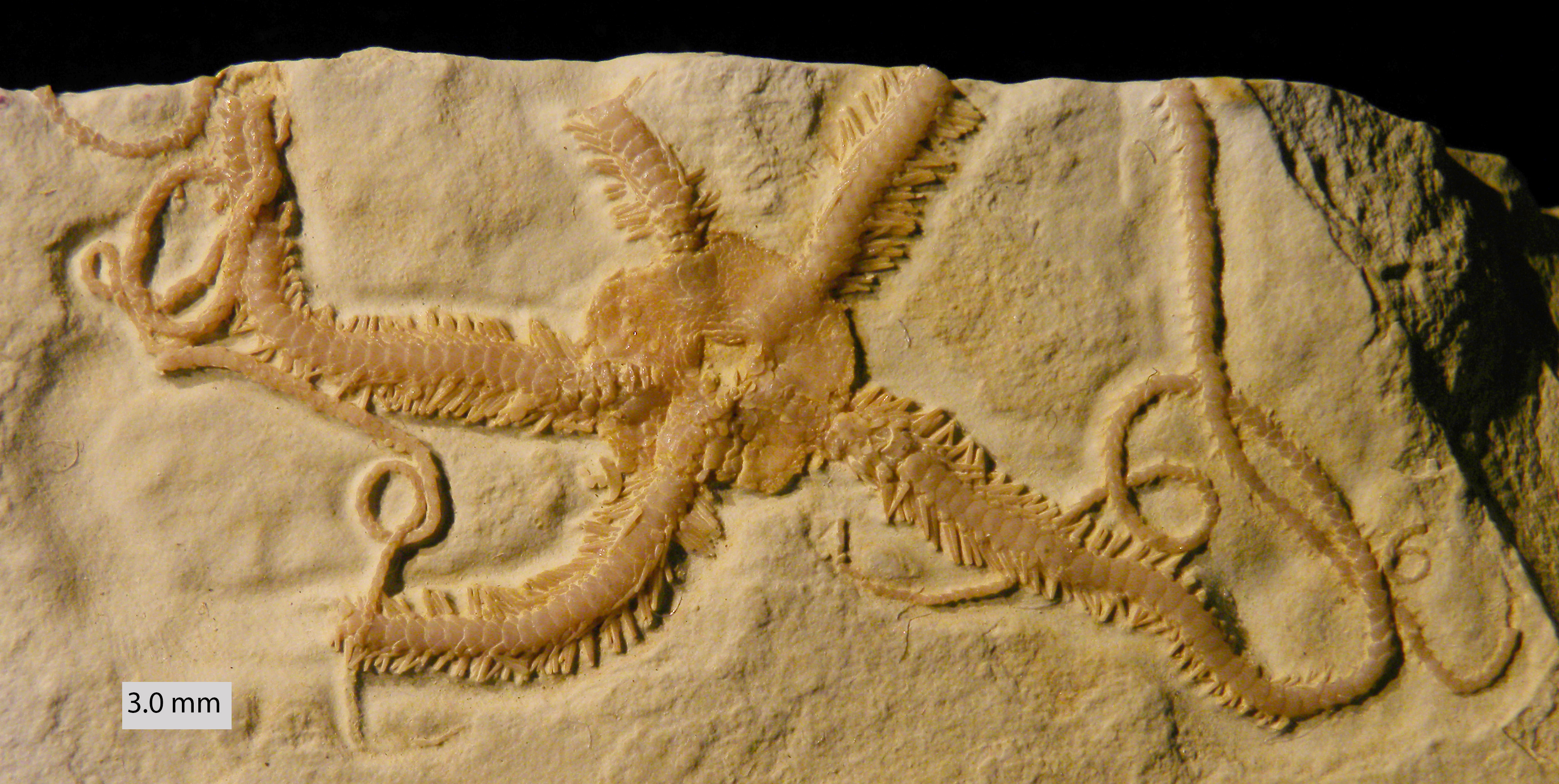
Ophiopetra lithographica from the Lower Hienheim Beds (Lower Tithonian, Upper Jurassic) near Regensburg, Germany.

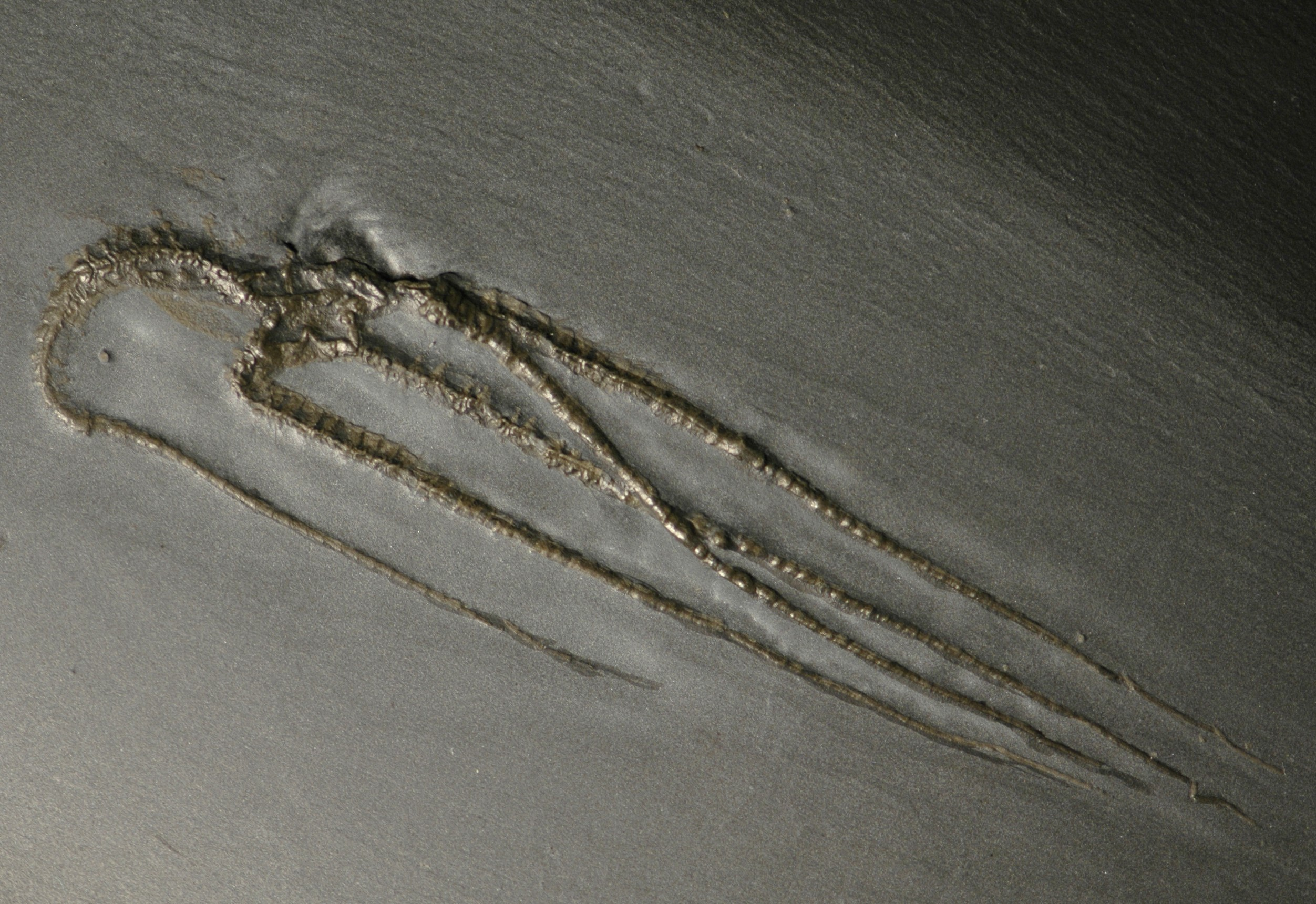
Furcaster paleozoicus (Stürtz, 1886) (8.5 cm long) with current aligned arms from the Hunsrück Lagerstätte (Lower Devonian) of western Germany.

- Acinetaster
- Aganaster
- Amphiophiura
- Amphioplus
- Antiquaster
- Aplocoma
- Archaeophiomusium
- Arenorbis
- Argentinaster
- Armathyraster
- Aspiduriella
- Asteronyx (Müller & Troschel, 1842)
- Aulactis
- Bdellacoma
- Brezinacantha
- Bohemura
- Cheiropteraster
- Cholaster
- Crepidosoma
- Drepanaster
- Encrinaster
- Eophiura
- Eospondylus
- Euzonosoma
- Furcaster† (Stürtz, 1886)
- Geocoma† (d'Orbigny, 1850)
- Gorgonocephalid
- Hallaster
- Hemieurylae
- Kentrospondylus
- Klasmura
- Lapworthura
- Loriolaster
- Lumectaster
- Marginix† (Martínez & del Río, 2015)
- Mastigactis
- Mastigophiura
- Medusaster
- Miospondylus
- Nullamphiura
- Onychaster
- Ophiacantha
- Ophiaulax
- Ophiocnida
- Ophiocoma (L. Agassiz, 1835)
- Ophiocrossota
- Ophiocten
- Ophioglyphoida
- Ophiolancea
- Ophiomusium (Lyman, 1869)
- Ophiopetra† (Enay & Hess, 1962)
- Ophiopinna
- Ophiothrix (Müller & Troschel, 1840)
- Ophiotitanos
- Ophiotrigonum
- Ophiura (Lamarck, 1801)
- Ophiurella
- Ophiurina (suborder) (Müller & Troschel, 1840)
- Ophiuriocoma
- Paleocoma† (d'Orbigny, 1850)
- Palaeophiura
- Palaeura
- Phragmactis
- Pradesura
- Protaster
- Ptilonaster
- Rhopalocoma
- Schoenaster
- Silesiaster
- Sinosura
- Stenaster† (Billings, 1857)
- Stephanoura
- Stuertzaster
- Syntomospina
- Taeniaster
- Tremataster
- Urosoma
- Vandelcoaster
- Xanthamphiura

== See also ==
- List of prehistoric sea cucumbers
- List of crinoid genera
