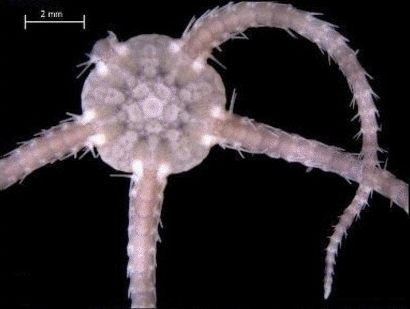
- Dorsal side of O. sarsii

Scientific classification
- Kingdom: Animalia
- Phylum: Echinodermata
- Class: Ophiuroidea
- Order: Ophiurida
- Family: Ophiuridae
- Genus: Ophiura
- Species: O. sarsii

Binomial name
- Ophiura sarsii Lütken, 1855

= Ophiura sarsii =

Species of brittle star

Ophiura sarsii or the notched brittle star is a benthic, marine, cold-water species of brittle star found commonly in the Arctic and Sub-Arctic seas. This species was discovered by Christian Frederik Lütken in 1855. They are commonly red or brown.

Ophiura sarsii is a large and abundant species that can live for up to 27 years. They live on soft sediment in the bathypelagic zone of the ocean. They are trophic generalists but mostly feed on amphipods, and are the primary prey of many larger fish and crabs. They are hypothesized to colonize red king crabs in order to avoid predation. O. sarsii limbs are used for anti-allergenic and anti-inflammatory medication, and may be able to be used in order to create an anti-HIV medication. Their distribution and biomass have been greatly affected by climate change, but some subspecies may be regulating their gene expression differently in order to combat this.

== Morphology ==
Adult O. sarsii have arms that can extend up to 90 millimeters or 3-4 times the disk size. Their central disks are commonly up to 25 millimeters in diameter but can be as large as 40 millimeters in diameter. Their disk is rigid and heavily calcified. This is much larger than the species Ophiocten sericeum, a different species of cold water brittle star that inhabits the same habitats. O. sericeum only has a maximum disk size of 18 mm. As it transitions out of its larval stage, the central disk becomes a pentagonal shape with small perforations. As it continues to grow, it gains spines, arms and arm joints, as well as protective plates.

== Growth ==
This species of brittle star can live for up to 27 years. It has been found that they have an 8-year period of fast growth followed by a 4-5 year period of no growth, then a period of fast growth until their death. Growth in brittle stars can be measured using the growth bands on their disks.

== Habitat ==
They have been found in the northern parts of the Atlantic and Pacific Oceans, as well as the entirety of the Arctic Ocean. Their distribution is primarily in the bathyal zone of the open ocean, in some parts covering as much as 96% of the seabed. In the Arctic sea, they mostly inhabit slopes and shelves with soft bottoms. They have been found to outnumber all other brittle star species in their habitat, making up 71% of the abundance in the benthic and epibenthic parts of the Arctic Ocean.

== Diet and feeding habits ==
=== Prey ===
They are primarily carnivorous, feeding on mostly amphipods. But they have also been found to eat arthropods, molluscs, cnidarians and annelids making them trophic, generalist feeders. However, their diet is mostly restricted to the amphipod families Ampeliscidae and Lysianassidae, which made up 54-70% of their stomach contents in during sampling periods in an experiment done by Harris et al., 2009.

=== Predators ===
O. sarsii are prey of benthic carnivorous fish and crab species. They are the main prey of the American Plaice in the Gulf of Maine, with one study by Packer et al. (1994) finding that 82% of their gut contents were made up of ophiuroids, 65% of which were O. sarsii. Over 50% of adult red king crabs were also found to consume brittle stars like O. sarsii.

== Epibiosis ==
A study done by Dvoretsky & Dvoretsky, 2021 found that O. sarsii and other deep sea echinoderms were colonizing the red king crab in parts of the Barents Sea. Red king crabs are predators of O. sarsii and this study hypothesizes that they colonize these crabs to avoid predation. Possible consequences to the red king crab of this could be increased egg mortality and decreased gill efficiency if the colonizers crawl into their gills or onto their brood of eggs. However, infestations of O. sarsii and other echinoderms are only found in 0.7-1.1% of red king crabs.

== Human usage ==
When fresh O. sarsii tissue is collected, sulfated steroidal polyols can be isolated from it. These steroids can potentially be used for anti-HIV medication since they can inhibit some enzymes and cause cell death. THA found in the limbs of them can be isolated into an anti-inflammatory and anti-allergenic substance. Since it is so abundant, they are widely used as a source of THA. There are no known fisheries for O. sarsii and other Arctic brittle stars.

== Impacts of climate change ==
Due to global warming, it appears as though O. sarsii has undergone a decrease in overall growth and biomass, especially in the Yellow Sea. This has been found to alter their distribution and behaviors. The warming of the ocean can also result in proteins and enzymes unfolding inside O. sarsii DNA, since they are a cold-water species. However, a study done by Liao et al., 2025 found that a subspecies of O. sarsii may be able to stop the effects of global warming on their bodies by regulating gene expression.
