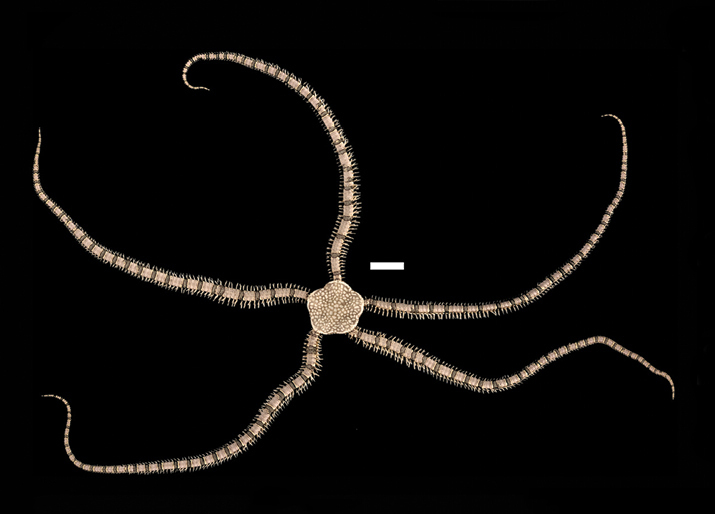

Scientific classification
- Kingdom: Animalia
- Phylum: Echinodermata
- Class: Ophiuroidea
- Order: Ophiurida
- Family: Ophionereididae
- Genus: Ophionereis
- Species: O. annulata

Binomial name
- Ophionereis annulata Le Conte, 1851

= Ophionereis annulata =

Species of brittle star

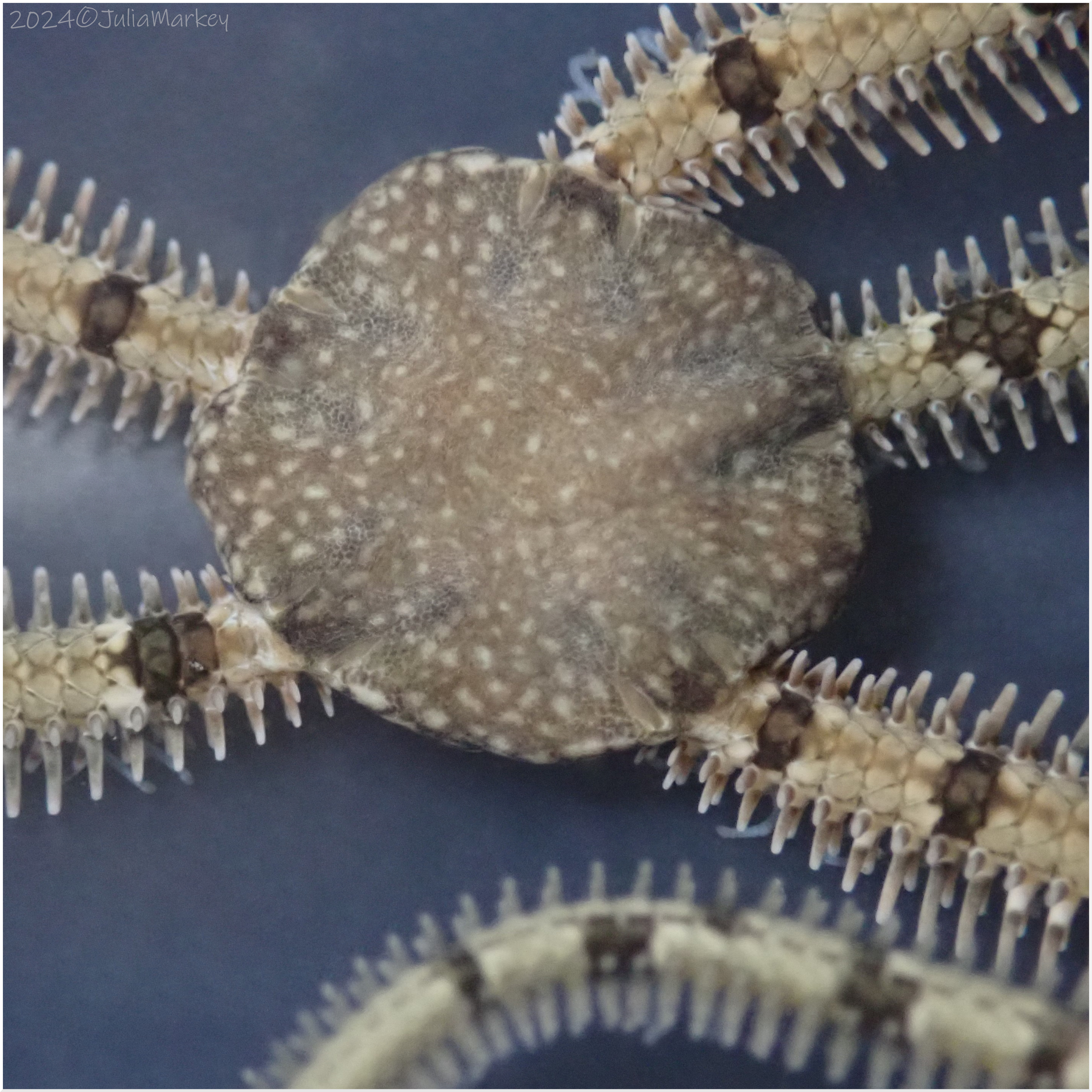
Ophionereis annulata observed in La Jolla, California in September, 2024

Ophionereis annulata, commonly known as the banded brittle star, is a species of brittle star in the family Ophionereididae.

== Distribution ==
The banded brittle star occurs in the eastern Pacific Ocean, along the coasts of North and Central America from Santa Barbara, California, to Ecuador, as well the Galapagos Islands. It dwells in the mid- to low intertidal zone under rocky overhangs, in algae, or in sandy pools. Juveniles are often found in sponge or barnacle beds.

== Description ==
The banded brittle star has five long, flat arms, or radii. The arms have distinct dark gray-brown bands, with each band flanked by a thin white stripe or blotching on either side. The exact shape and color of the bands can vary depending on the individual; they may appear oval, diamond-shaped, or rectangular, and range in various shades of gray-brown. The central disc is typically circular and light- to medium gray-brown in color, speckled with white dots. The edge of the disc is scalloped between each arm; if the scalloping is more pronounced, the disc may appear pentagonal or star-shaped.

Juveniles appear similar to adults, but with thinner, more flexible arms.

== Ecology ==
=== Commensalism ===
The banded brittle stars which live in the Mexican Pacific are the preferred hosts of the scale worm Malmgreniella cf. variegate, a small commensal polychaete which climbs the arms of the banded brittle star and attaches itself to its host's central disc. The worm's position on the central disc (whether it is on the aboral or oral side, near the brittle star's mouth) may be determined by the amount of light present in its environment, as observed during research conducted from 2007 to 2013. During this research, the scale worm was shown to greatly prefer the banded brittle star as a host over other similar species in the same genus.

=== Feeding and movement ===
The banded brittle star utilizes different methods of feeding depending on the size of a given food particle; if the particle is relatively large, the brittle star grasps it with the tip of its arm and coils its arm to bring it to the mouth, whereas if the particle is relatively small it uses its elongate tube feet to transport food to its mouth.

Unlike most Ophiuroid brittle stars, banded brittle stars locomote by taking small "steps" with their tube feet rather than with sweeping movements of the arms.

=== Reproduction and growth ===
The banded brittle star reproduces sexually.

In their larval state, banded brittle stars are extremely small and planktonic, like other echinoderm larvae. They are barrel-like in shape. Unlike many larval echinoderms, however, banded brittle star larvae subsist on yolk (making them a type of larvae referred to as vitellariae), rather than using their bands of cilia (hair-like structures) to catch and feed on food particles. As they grow, banded brittle star larvae develop vestiges of skeletal structures typical of feeding (ophiopluteus) larvae, indicating that yolk-subsisting vitellariae like the banded brittle star evolved from ophiopluteus larvae, rather than being distinct and divergent.
