= O. victoriae =

O. victoriae may refer to:

- Odostomia victoriae, a sea snail
- Ornithoptera victoriae (Queen Victoria's birdwing), a butterfly found in the Solomon Islands and Papua New Guinea
- Ophionotus victoriae, a brittle star
