= Ophionereis diabloensis =

Scientific classification
- Kingdom: Animalia
- Phylum: Echinodermata
- Class: Ophiuroidea
- Order: Ophiurida
- Family: Ophionereididae
- Genus: Ophionereis
- Species: O. diabloensis

Binomial name
- Ophionereis diabloensis Hendler, 2002

Species of brittle star

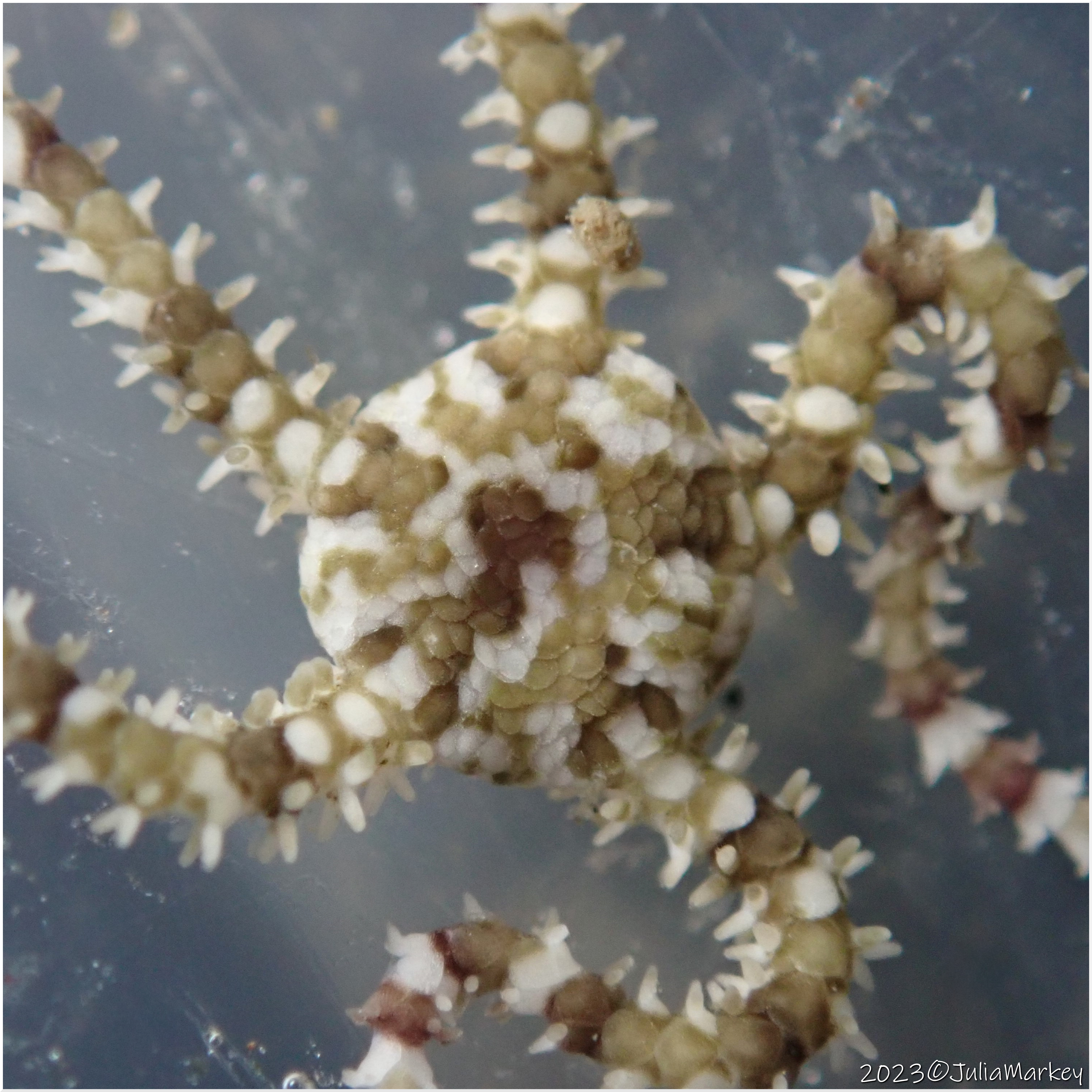
Ophionereis diabloensis observed in La Jolla, California in May, 2023

Ophionereis diabloensis is a species of brittle star. Native to the waters of Southern California and Baja California, the type species was collected at Diablo Cove, near Avila Beach in San Luis Obispo County.
