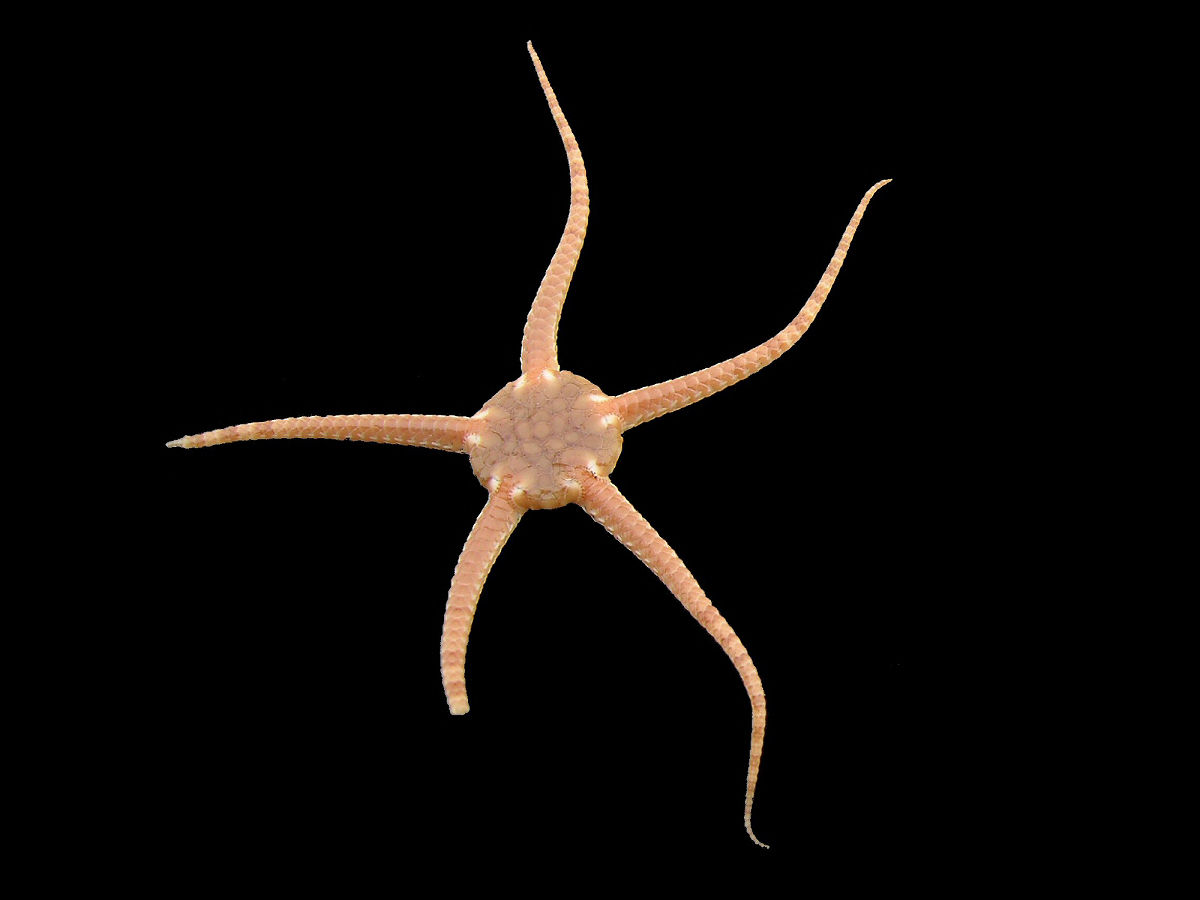
- Ophiura albida with one broken arm

Scientific classification
- Kingdom: Animalia
- Phylum: Echinodermata
- Class: Ophiuroidea
- Order: Ophiurida
- Family: Ophiuridae
- Genus: Ophiura
- Species: O. albida

Binomial name
- Ophiura albida Forbes, 1839

Synonyms
- Ophioglypha albida (Forbes, 1839); Ophiura albida var. tuberculosa Mortensen, 1933

= Ophiura albida =

Species of brittle star

Ophiura albida is a species of brittle star in the order Ophiurida. It is typically found on the seabed in the north-eastern Atlantic Ocean and in the Mediterranean Sea, and is sometimes known as the serpent's table brittle star.

== Description ==
Ophiura albida has a central disc reaching a diameter of about 1.5 centimetres (0.6 in) and five arms up to 6 centimetres (2.4 in) long. The disc is flattened, and the upper surface is covered in small plates. These are mostly brick red, but the plates at the edge of the disc close to where the arms are attached are white. The arms are slender and fragile, segmented and gradually tapering. The plates on the upper and lower sides have convex edges. Each segment has three short spines which lie flat on the surface, and there are small pores between the plates. This latter fact helps to distinguish this species from the otherwise very similar Ophiura ophiura. The underside of the disc is a pale colour and has a central mouth with five large plates modified as jaws and fringed with teeth.

== Distribution and habitat ==
Ophiura albida is found at depths down to about 200 metres (660 ft), or 850 metres (2,790 ft) according to one authority. Its range extends from Norway to the Mediterranean Sea and the Azores. It occurs on the seabed on soft substrates including coarse sand, fine sand, gravel and muddy sand. It is common round the coasts of the British Isles and has occurred at densities as great as 900 per 1 square metre (11 sq ft).

== Biology ==
Ophiura albida is a predator and scavenger and feeds on such small invertebrates as polychaete worms, crustaceans and bivalve molluscs. In the Baltic Sea it is the favourite food of the starfish Luidia sarsi and is chosen in preference to other brittle stars. In the Irish Sea it is eaten along with the common brittle star (Ophiothrix fragilis) by the fast-moving seven armed starfish (Luidia ciliaris).

Individuals of this species are either male or female. Fertilisation is external, and the larvae are planktonic. It is a fast-growing brittle star and is not thought to live for more than three years.
