= Astrophiuridae =

Astrophiuridae Temporal range: 184.2–0 Ma Early Jurassic to Present
- Astrophiura caroleae (oral view)

Scientific classification
- Kingdom: Animalia
- Phylum: Echinodermata
- Class: Ophiuroidea
- Order: Ophiurida
- Suborder: Ophiurina
- Family: Astrophiuridae; Sladen, 1879

Type genus
- Astrophiura Sladen, 1879

Genera
- 3, see text

Family of brittle stars

Astrophiuridae is a family of very small brittle stars in the order Ophiurida containing three genera. Their size is usually in millimeters.

The earliest fossil from this family (Ophiomisidium pratchettae†) dates back to the Toarcian in the Early Jurassic. Fossils have also been found dated to the Late Cretaceous.

== Taxonomy ==
The family and type genus was described by Percy Sladen in 1879. The phylogenetic tree per O'Hara et al. (2017) is as follows.

- - Ophiurida
    - Ophiurina
      - - Ophiopyrgidae
        - Ophiuridae
      - Astrophiuridae
    - Ophiomusina
      - Ophiomusaidae
      - Ophiosphalmidae

The following three genera are included in the family.

- Astrophiura Sladen, 1879
- Ophiomisidium Koehler, 1914
- Ophiophycis Koehler, 1901
