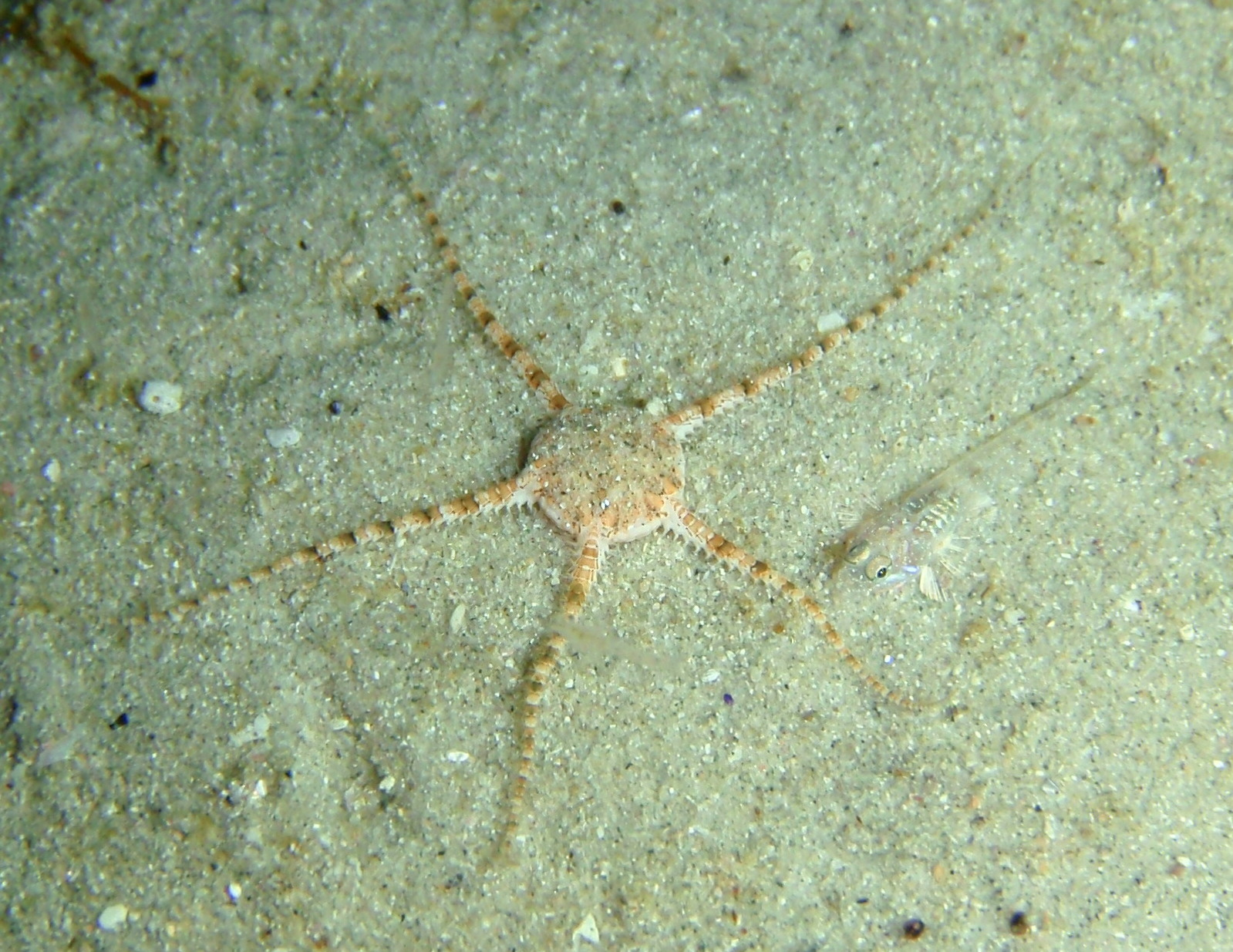
- Ophiuroglypha kinbergi

Scientific classification
- Kingdom: Animalia
- Phylum: Echinodermata
- Class: Ophiuroidea
- Order: Ophiurida
- Suborder: Ophiomusina
- Family: Ophiopyrgidae; Perrier, 1893

Type genus
- Ophiopyrgus Lyman, 1878

Genera
- 22, see text

= Ophiopyrgidae =

Ophiopyrgidae Temporal range: 241.4–0 Ma Middle Triassic to Present

Family of brittle stars

Ophiopyrgidae is a family of brittle stars in the order Ophiurida.

The earliest fossil from this family (Palaeocoma raiblana†) dates back to the Ladinian in the Middle Triassic. (Note: The species is listed under Ophiodermatidae but has since been moved to Ophiopyrgidae.) Fossils have also been found dating to the Late Carnian in Late Triassic.

== Taxonomy ==
The phylogenetic tree per O'Hara et al. (2017) is as follows.

- - Ophiurida
    - Ophiurina
      - - Ophiopyrgidae
        - Ophiuridae
      - Astrophiuridae
    - Ophiomusina
      - Ophiomusaidae
      - Ophiosphalmidae

The following 22 genera are included in the family.

- Amphiophiura Matsumoto, 1915
- Anophiura H.L. Clark, 1939
- Aspidophiura Matsumoto, 1915
- Euvondrea Fell, 1961
- Glaciacantha Fell, 1961
- Gymnophiura Lütken & Mortensen, 1899
- Ophioculina† Roussea & Thuy, 2018
- Ophiogona Studer, 1876
- Ophiomages Koehler, 1923
- Ophioperla Koehler, 1912
- Ophiophyllum Lyman, 1878
- Ophiopleura Danielssen & Koren, 1877
- Ophioplinthus Lyman, 1878
- Ophiopyrgoides H.L. Clark, 1939
- Ophiopyrgus Lyman, 1878
- Ophiosparte Koehler, 1922
- Ophiosteira Bell, 1902
- Ophiotardis† Thuy & Numberger-Thuy, 2021
- Ophiuroglypha Hertz, 1927
- Palaeocoma† d'Orbigny, 1850
- Spinophiura Stöhr & Segonzac, 2006
- Stegophiura Matsumoto, 1915
