= Ophiosphalmidae =

Ophiosphalmidae Temporal range: 237–0 Ma Late Triassic to Present
- Ophiosphalma glabrum (aboral and oral view)

Scientific classification
- Kingdom: Animalia
- Phylum: Echinodermata
- Class: Ophiuroidea
- Order: Ophiurida
- Suborder: Ophiomusina
- Family: Ophiosphalmidae; O'Hara, Stöhr, Hugall, Thuy & Martynov, 2018

Type genus
- Ophiosphalma H.L. Clark, 1941

Genera
- 4, see text

Family of brittle stars

Ophiosphalmidae is a family of brittle stars in the order Ophiurida containing four genera. Fossils from this family (Thanataster doii†) have been found dating to the Carnian in Late Triassic.

== Taxonomy ==
The phylogenetic tree per O'Hara et al. (2017) is as follows.

- - Ophiurida
    - Ophiurina
      - - Ophiopyrgidae
        - Ophiuridae
      - Astrophiuridae
    - Ophiomusina
      - Ophiomusaidae
      - Ophiosphalmidae

The following six genera are included in the family.

- Enakomusium† Thuy, 2015
- Ophiolipus Lyman, 1878
- Ophiomusium Lyman, 1869
- Ophiosphalma H.L. Clark, 1941
- Perlophiura Belyaev & Litvinova, 1972
- Thanataster† Thuy & Numberger-Thuy, 2021
