= Ophionereis schayeri =

Scientific classification
- Kingdom: Animalia
- Phylum: Echinodermata
- Class: Ophiuroidea
- Order: Amphilepidida
- Family: Ophionereididae
- Genus: Ophionereis
- Species: O. schayeri

Binomial name
- Ophionereis schayeri Müller & Troschel 1844

Species of brittle star

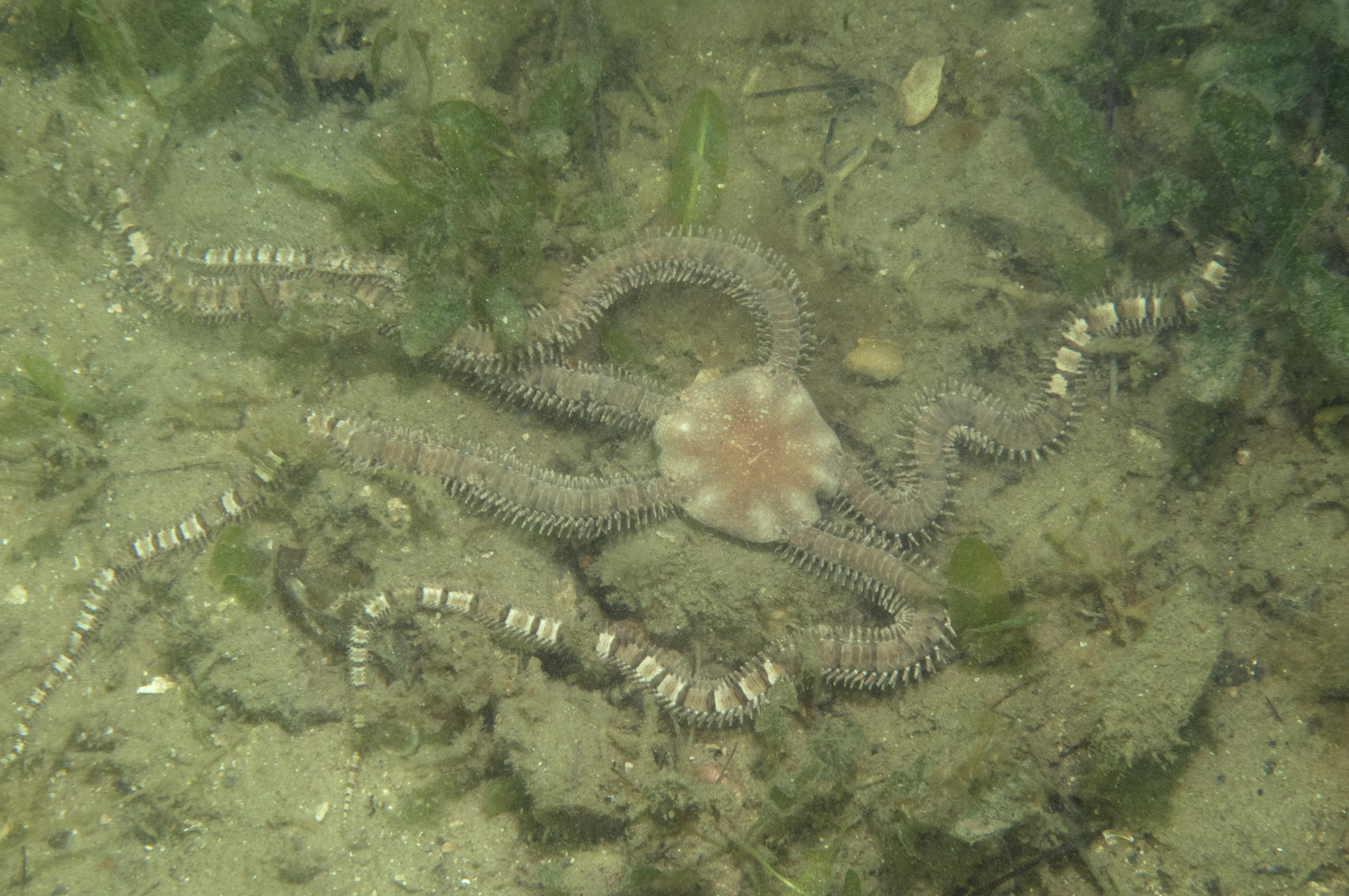
At Tortoise Head Shallows, Victoria

Ophionereis schayeri, Schayer's brittle star, is a brittle star in the family Ophionereididae.

== Description ==
The central disk is up to 2.5 centimetres wide, with arms to 15 centimetres long. The species is a filter-feeder that sifts sand and mud from the ocean floor for detritus and plankton.

== Habitat and distribution ==
Schayer's Brittle Star is found off the coast of Australia. Areas include New South Wales, Victoria, South Australia, Western Australia and Tasmania. It is the largest and most common brittle star found near Sydney.

The species occurs from the inter-tidal zone to 180 metres below sea level. This brittle star may be found under boulders in tidal areas. It moves quickly away from light when exposed. To reduce exposure to high temperatures, O. schayeri will form clusters under boulders in rocky reef habitats. Under these boulders, they scavenge for food by extending their arms out at night. Like many species inhabiting tide pools, O. schayeri may be particularly susceptible to the increased temperatures and ocean acidification engendered by climate change.

== Life cycle ==
As all brittle stars, Schayer’s brittle star undergoes a process of metamorphoses throughout their life cycle, starting from planktotrophy and moving to brooded lecithotrophy. The larva of a Schayer’s brittle star is bilaterally symmetrical, with a ciliated band around the body. The next developmental form is a vitellaria larva, bordered by ciliary ridges. The vitellaria larva soon develops juvenile tube feet and ventral skeletal plates. This metamorphosis results in a full body transformation from bilateral to radial symmetrical form, the last of which resembles other members of the Echinodermata phylum. (Selvakumaraswamy & Byrne, 2004). This evolutionary adaptation from planktotrophic to lecithotrophic development can be associated with an increased maternal reliance. The lecithotrophic development evolved along with a larger egg. Both of these evolutionary adaptations led to an increase in triglyceride present in the eggs. The effect of this increase in triglyceride levels on the eggs is still currently undergoing research (Inke et al, 2006).

== Bioluminescence ==
Similar to the related species O. fasciata, Schayer's brittle star is capable of bioluminescence, which may function as a warning to predators. It is hypothesized that this behavioral phenomenon requires extra-cellular calcium, associating with the radial nerve chord in order to trigger the luminescence. The fluorescent cells are photocytes, which can be found under the ventral, dorsal, and lateral arm plates. The true functional purpose of this bioluminescence has yet to be studied.
