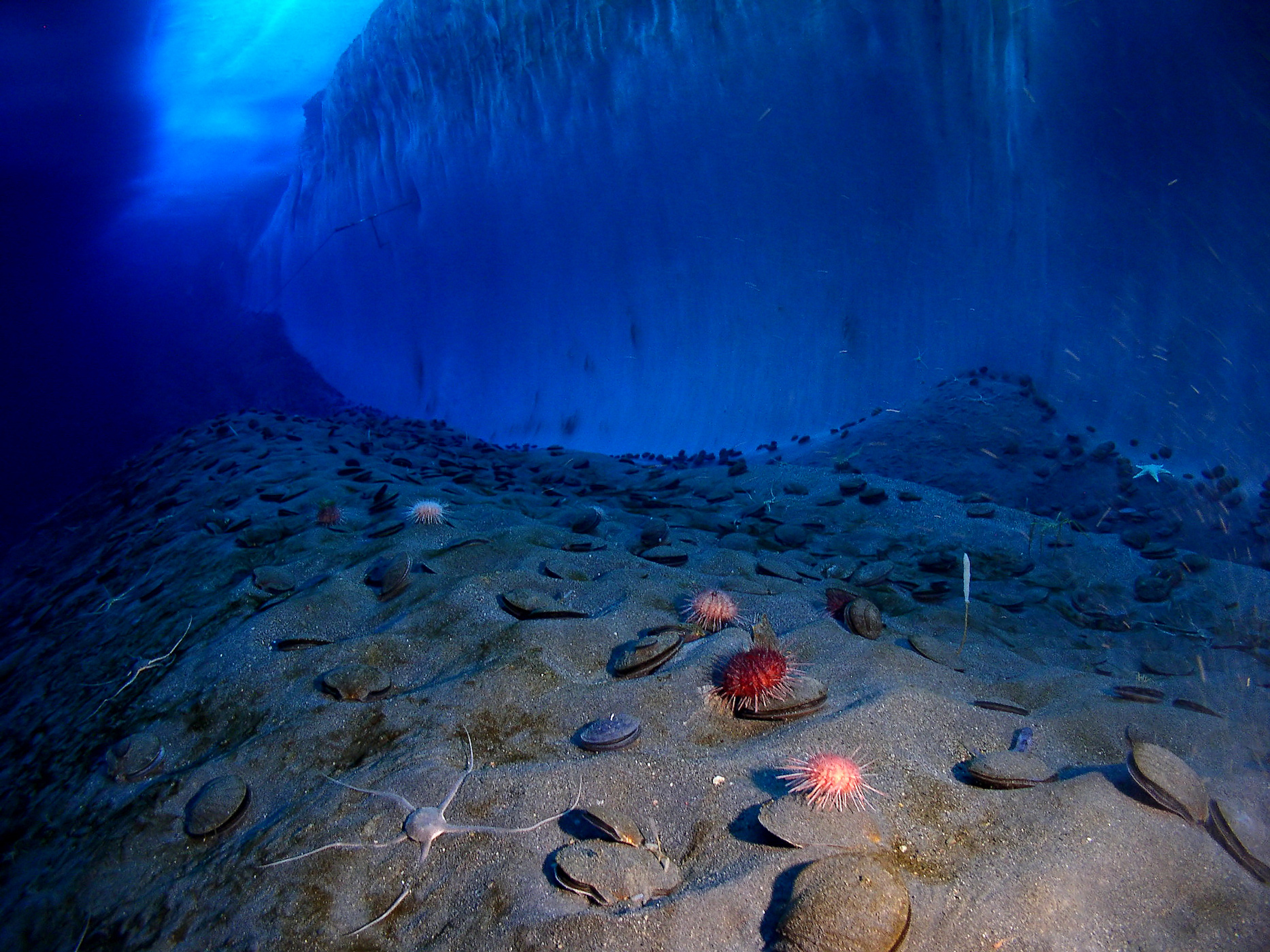
- Ophionotus victoriae (lower left) and several other animals in McMurdo Sound, Antarctica

Scientific classification
- Kingdom: Animalia
- Phylum: Echinodermata
- Class: Ophiuroidea
- Order: Ophiurida
- Family: Ophiuridae
- Genus: Ophionotus
- Species: O. victoriae

Binomial name
- Ophionotus victoriae Bell, 1902

Synonyms
- Ophiura victoriae (Bell, 1902)

= Ophionotus victoriae =

Species of brittle star

Ophionotus victoriae is a species of brittle star in the order Ophiurida. It has a circumpolar distribution around Antarctica.

== Description ==
Ophionotus victoriae is a large brittle star. It has a wide disc 4 centimetres (1.6 in) in diameter and 5 arms that reach 9 centimetres (3.5 in) in length. The colour is variable, being white, grey, brown or bluish.

== Distribution and habitat ==
Ophionotus victoriae is endemic to the seas around Antarctica where it is found at depths down to 1,266 metres (4,154 ft). It is sometimes abundant and may represent 60–90% numerically and 40–80% by mass of the total macrofauna of the area.

== Biology ==
Like other Antarctic invertebrates, Ophionotus victoriae has a slow growth rate and can live up to 22 years. It is a predator and opportunistic generalist and feeds on a wide range of invertebrates, especially krill. It also scavenges, feeds on detritus and even juvenile brittle stars. It is itself preyed on by fish and also by the large brittle star, Ophiosparte gigas, from which it flees. The females spawn in the Antarctic summer and the larvae develop slowly, forming part of the zooplankton before settling on the seabed and becoming juvenile brittle stars.
