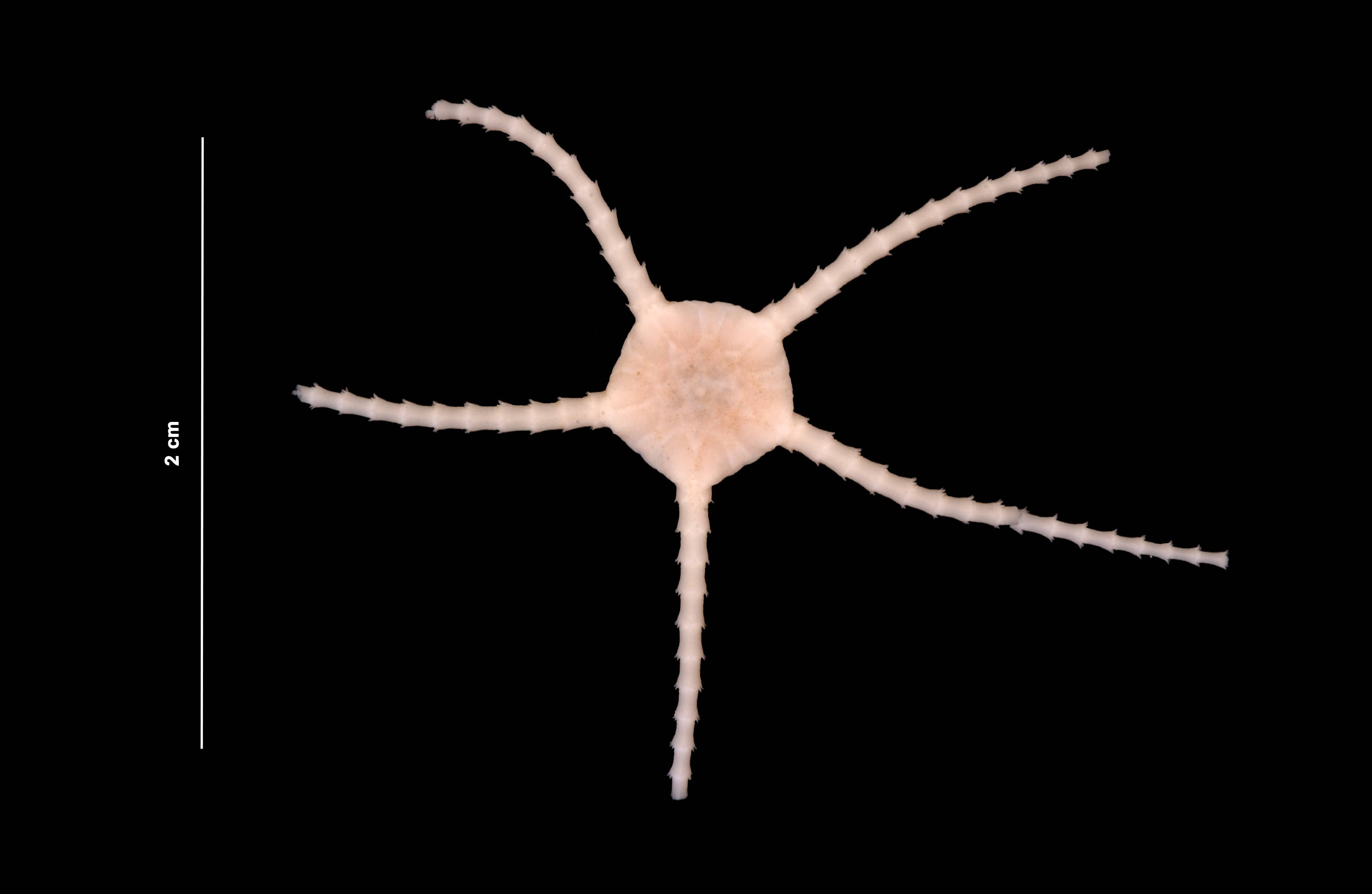
- Ophiomusium lymani

Scientific classification
- Kingdom: Animalia
- Phylum: Echinodermata
- Class: Ophiuroidea
- Order: Ophiurida
- Suborder: Ophiomusina; O'Hara et al., 2017

Families
- Ophiomusaidae O'Hara, Stöhr, Hugall, Thuy & Martynov, 2018; Ophiosphalmidae O'Hara, Stöhr, Hugall, Thuy & Martynov, 2018

= Ophiomusina =

Ophiomusina Temporal range: 237–0 Ma Late Triassic to Present

Suborder of brittle stars

Ophiomusina is one of the two suborders of echinoderms belonging to the order Ophiurida. It contains two families, which combine contain five genera. Fossils from this family have been found dating to the Late Carnian in Late Triassic and also from Late Aptian in Early Cretaceous.

== Taxonomy ==
There are two recognized families and one family with a temporary name which has an extinct genus.

- Ophiomusaidae O'Hara, Stöhr, Hugall, Thuy & Martynov, 2018
- Ophiosphalmidae O'Hara, Stöhr, Hugall, Thuy & Martynov, 2018
- Ophiomusina incertae sedis (temporary name)
  - Barbaraster† Thuy & Numberger-Thuy, 2021

The phylogenetic tree per O'Hara et al. (2017) is as follows.

- - Ophiurida
    - Ophiurina
      - - Ophiopyrgidae
        - Ophiuridae
      - Astrophiuridae
    - Ophiomusina
      - Ophiomusaidae
      - Ophiosphalmidae
