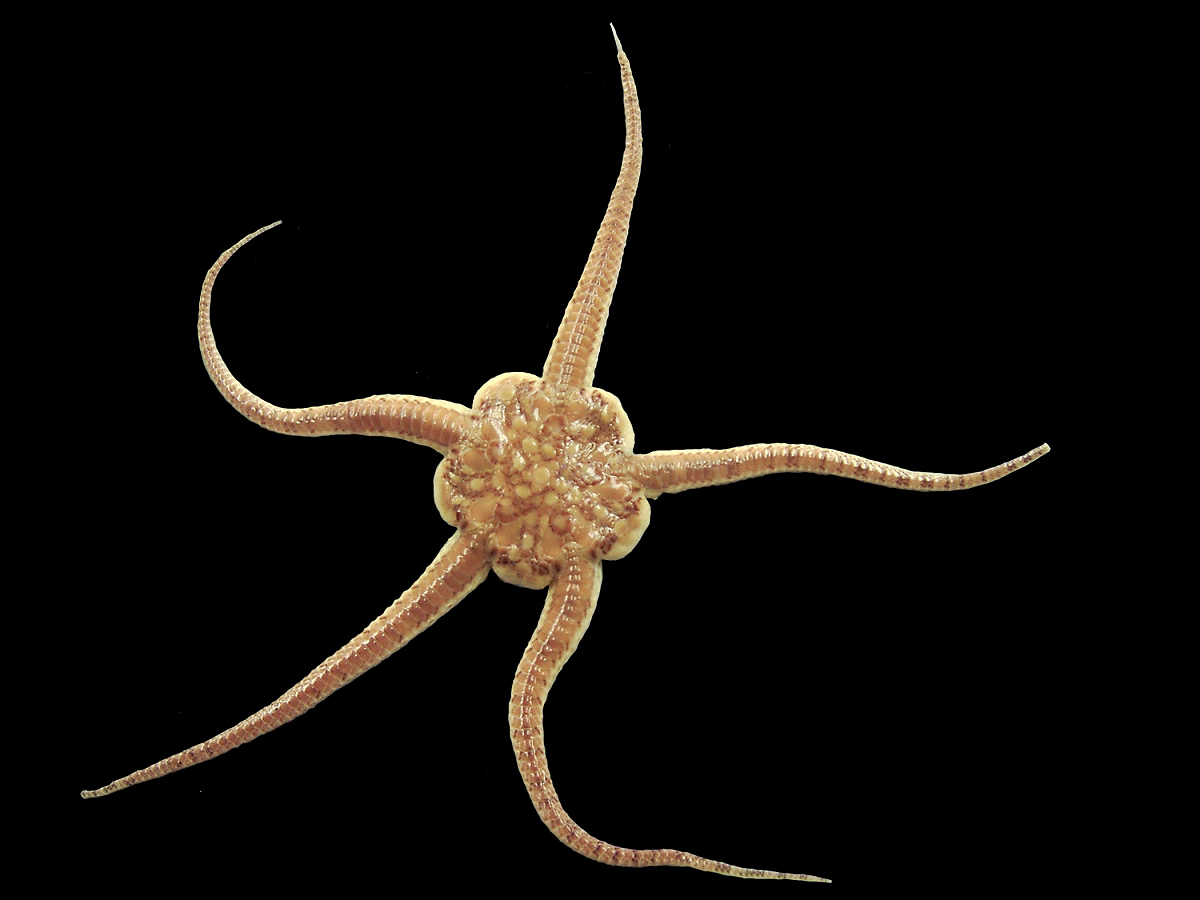
- Ophiura ophiura

Scientific classification
- Kingdom: Animalia
- Phylum: Echinodermata
- Class: Ophiuroidea
- Order: Ophiurida
- Suborder: Ophiurina; Müller and Troschel, 1840 sensu O'Hara et al., 2017

Families
- Astrophiuridae; Ophiopyrgidae; Ophiuridae

Synonyms
- Ophiolepidina Ljungman, 1867

= Ophiurina =

Ophiurina Temporal range: 469.4–0 Ma Middle Ordovician to Present

Suborder of brittle stars

Ophiurina is a suborder of brittle stars in the order Opihurida. The earliest fossil from this suborder (Protaster†) dates back to the Darriwilian in the Middle Ordovician. (Note: The genus is listed under Oegophiurida but has since been moved to Ophiurina.)

== Characteristics ==
Ophiurina contain a large number of ophiuroids with characteristics ranging from skin just covering the disk, the presence or absence of arm combs, and an infradental papilla occurring with a distinct diastema between it and its flanking oral papillae.

== Taxonomy ==
There are three families in the suborder:

- Astrophiuridae Sladen, 1879
- Ophiopyrgidae Perrier, 1893
- Ophiuridae Müller & Troschel, 1840

There is also a family with 11 extinct genera which is yet to be named.

- Ophiurina incertae sedis

The phylogenetic tree per O'Hara et al. (2017) is as follows.

- - Ophiurida
    - Ophiurina
      - - Ophiopyrgidae
        - Ophiuridae
      - Astrophiuridae
    - Ophiomusina
      - Ophiomusaidae
      - Ophiosphalmidae
