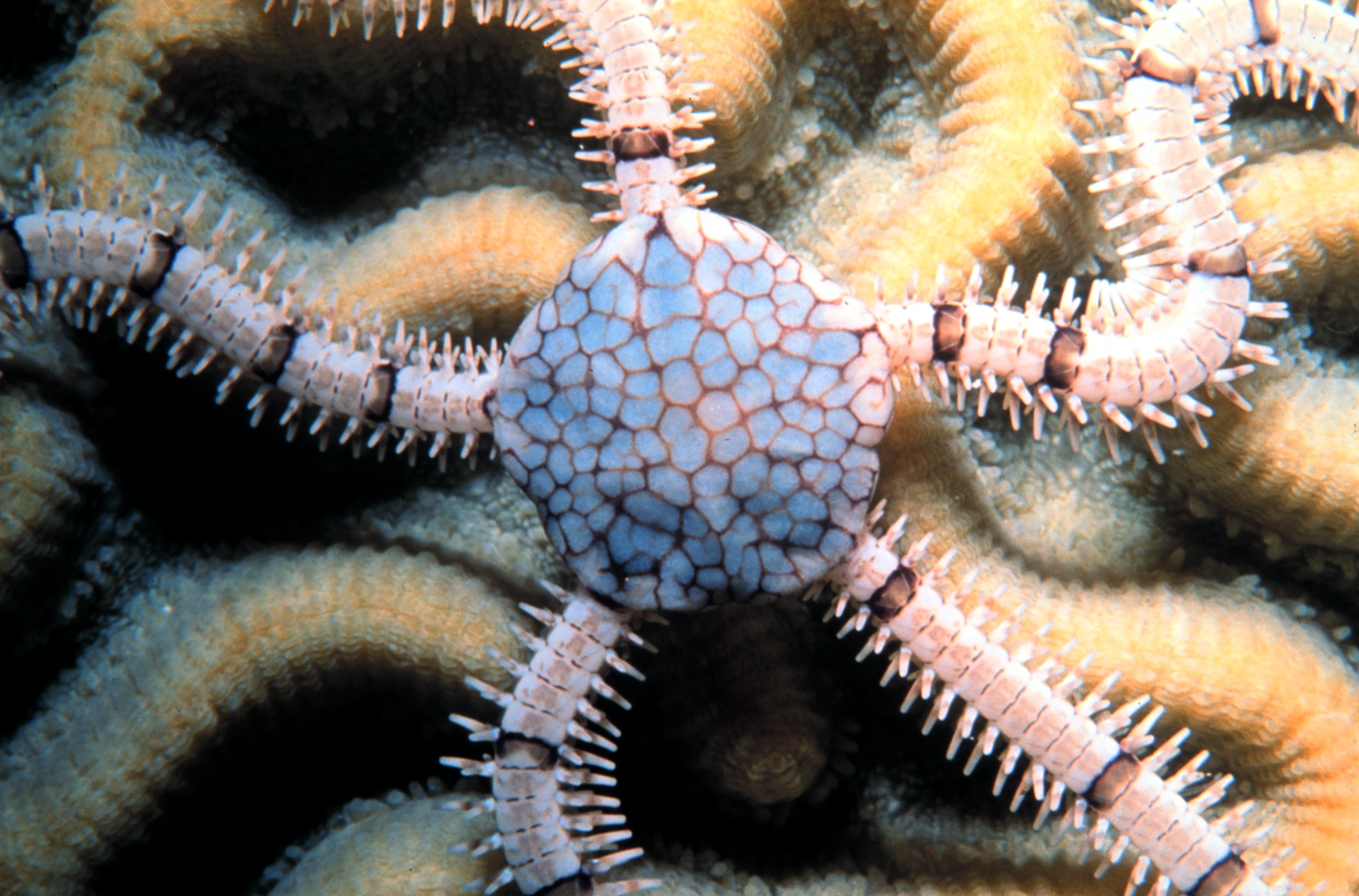

Scientific classification
- Kingdom: Animalia
- Phylum: Echinodermata
- Class: Ophiuroidea
- Order: Ophiurida
- Family: Ophionereididae
- Genus: Ophionereis
- Species: O. reticulata

Binomial name
- Ophionereis reticulata (Say, 1825)

Synonyms
- Ophiolepis nereis Lütken, 1856; Ophiura reticulata Say, 1825

= Ophionereis reticulata =

Species of brittle star

Ophionereis reticulata, the reticulated brittle star, is a brittle star in the family Ophionereididae. It is found in shallow parts of the western Atlantic, Caribbean Sea and Gulf of Mexico.

== Description ==
Like other brittle stars, Ophionereis reticulata has a small flattened, pentagonal disc and five narrow, elongated arms. The disc can grow to a diameter of 15 mm (0.6 in) and the arms to a length of 120 mm (4.7 in). The aboral (upper) surface of the disc is covered with small plates and is pale grey with a network of fine reddish-brown lines, giving it its common name. The arms have a large number of short joints and are fringed on either side with short spines. They are white or pale grey and have a band of chocolate brown approximately every fourth joint. This colouration makes the brittle star inconspicuous when viewed against its typical background.

== Distribution and habitat ==
Ophionereis reticulata is found in the western Atlantic Ocean, the Caribbean Sea and the Gulf of Mexico. Its range extends from the West Indies and Bermuda to Mexico, Belize, Honduras, Venezuela and Brazil. The type locality is the Florida Keys. It is found on sandy or shingle bottoms, among boulders and under rocks at depths of between 3 and 40 metres (9.8 and 131.2 ft).

== Behaviour ==
Ophionereis reticulata moves about on its arms with the disc clear of the substrate. Unlike many other brittle stars, it uses its tube feet in locomotion. These are long and pointed and are the only part of the arm to come in contact with the seabed. For bodily movement, the tips of the tube feet are extended forwards by bending them at right angles at the base. They are then straightened as the brittle star raises itself onto the points. By repeating these actions, the brittle star can creep forward at up to 50 centimetres (20 in) per minute. Any arm or pair of arms can be in the lead.

Ophionereis reticulata is an herbivore and filter feeder, but detritus and fragments of polychaete worm have also been found in its stomach. It mainly consumes red and green algae and diatoms which it catches by raising one or more of its arms into the passing water current while keeping its disc concealed. If an arm is attacked by a predator it can easily break off in a process known as autotomy, and the brittle star can later regenerate a new limb. The sexes are separate in Ophionereis reticulata and spawning takes place once a year. The ophiopluteus larvae are planktonic and after passing through several larval stages, settle on the seabed and undergo metamorphosis into juveniles.
