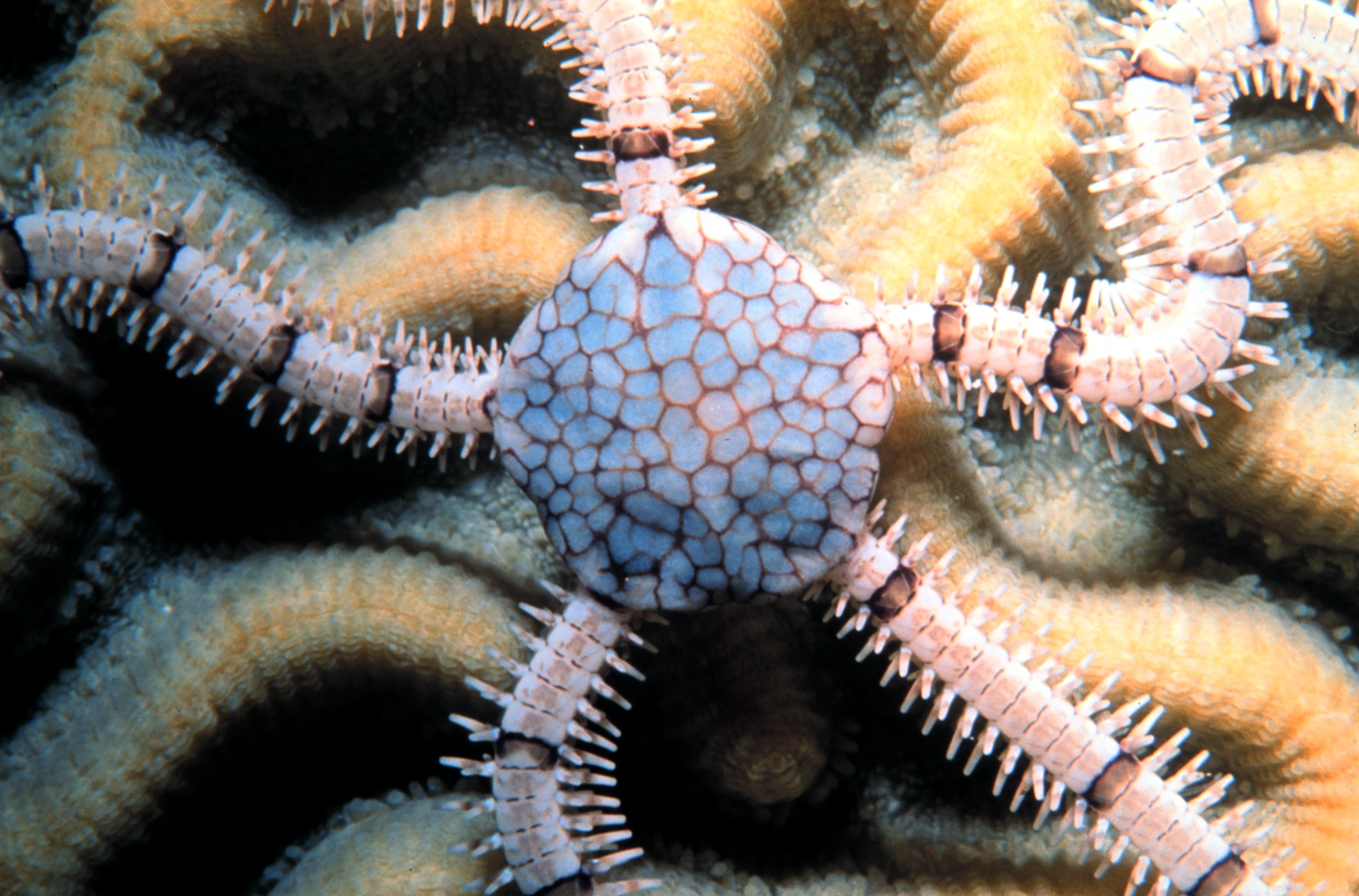
- Ophionereis reticulata

Scientific classification
- Kingdom: Animalia
- Phylum: Echinodermata
- Class: Ophiuroidea
- Order: Amphilepidida
- Family: Ophionereididae
- Genus: Ophionereis; Lütken, 1859

= Ophionereis =

Genus of brittle stars

Ophionereis is a genus of echinoderms belonging to the family Ophionereididae.

The genus has almost cosmopolitan distribution.

Species:

- Ophionereis albomaculata E.A.Smith, 1877
- Ophionereis amphilogus (Ziesenhenne, 1940)
- Ophionereis andamanensis James, 1982
- Ophionereis annulata (Le Conte, 1851)
- Ophionereis australis (H.L. Clark, 1923)
- Ophionereis commutabilis Bribiesca-Contreras, Pineda-Enríquez, Márquez-Borrás, Solís-Marín, Verbruggen, Hugall & O'Hara, 2019
- Ophionereis degeneri (A.H. Clark, 1949)
- Ophionereis diabloensis Hendler, 2002
- Ophionereis dolabriformis John & A.M.Clark, 1954
- Ophionereis dubia (Müller & Troschel, 1842)
- Ophionereis eurybrachiplax H.L. Clark, 1911
- Ophionereis fasciata Hutton, 1872
- Ophionereis fusca Brock, 1888
- Ophionereis hexactis H.L. Clark, 1938
- Ophionereis intermedia A.M.Clark, 1953
- Ophionereis lineata H.L. Clark, 1946
- Ophionereis novaezelandiae Mortensen, 1936
- Ophionereis olivacea H.L. Clark, 1900
- Ophionereis perplexa Ziesenhenne, 1940
- Ophionereis porrecta Lyman, 1860
- Ophionereis reticulata (Say, 1825)
- Ophionereis sasakii A.M.Clark, 1953
- Ophionereis schayeri (Müller & Troschel, 1844)
- Ophionereis semoni (Döderlein, 1896)
- Ophionereis sexradia Mortensen, 1936
- Ophionereis squamulosa Koehler, 1914
- Ophionereis sykesi O'Hara & Harding, 2015
- Ophionereis thryptica (Murakami, 1943)
- Ophionereis tigris H.L. Clark, 1938
- Ophionereis variegata Duncan, 1879
- Ophionereis vittata Hendler, 1995
- Ophionereis vivipara Mortensen, 1933
