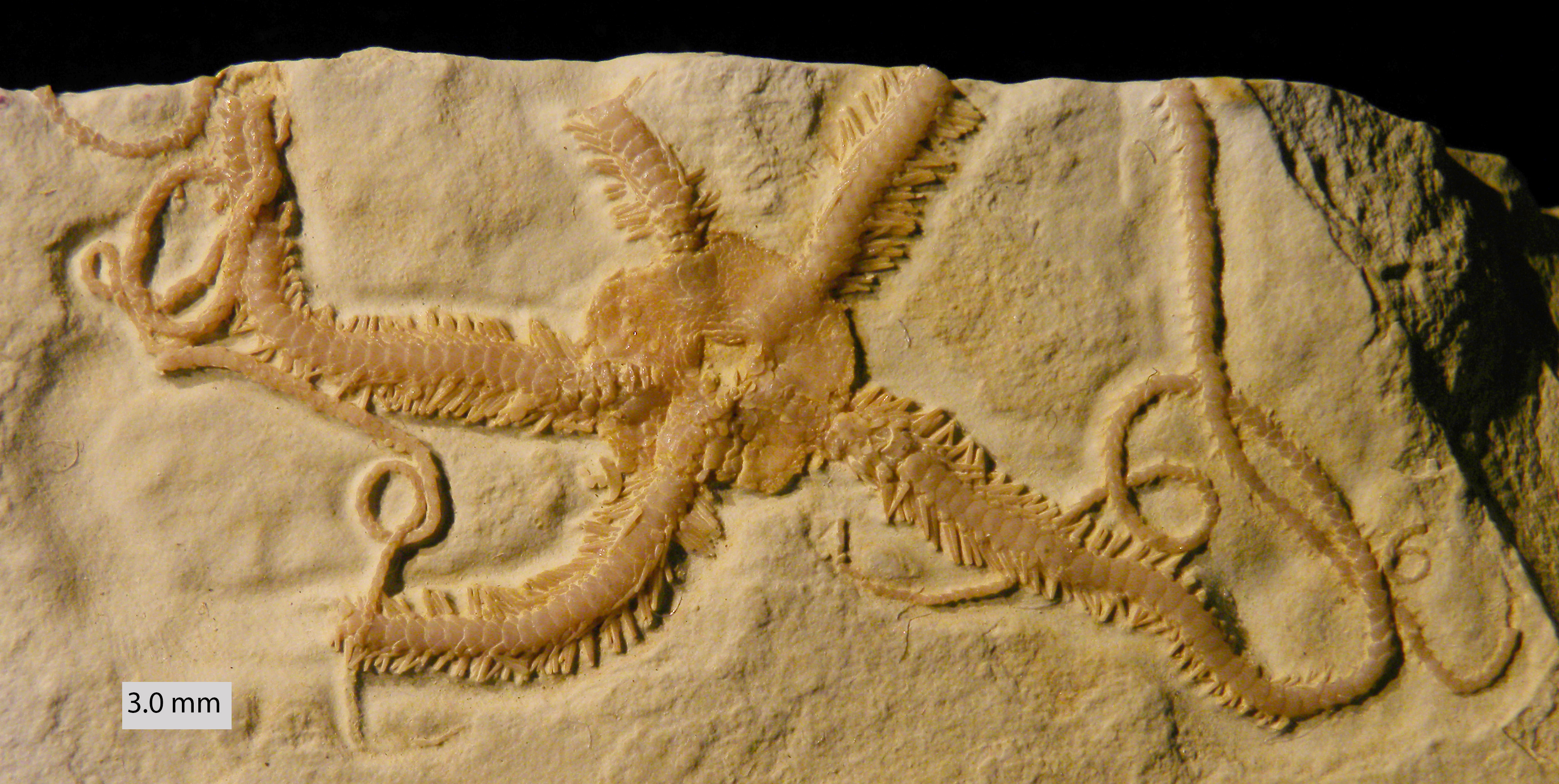

Scientific classification
- Kingdom: Animalia
- Phylum: Echinodermata
- Class: Ophiuroidea
- Order: Amphilepidida
- Family: Ophiolepididae
- Genus: †Ophiopetra; Enay & Hess, 1962
- Species: †O. lithographica

Binomial name
- †Ophiopetra lithographica Enay & Hess, 1962

= Ophiopetra =

Ophiopetra Temporal range: Late Jurassic

Genus of brittle stars

Ophiopetra is an extinct genus of brittle stars. It lived in lagoons in Solnhofen Plattenkalk Formation. It has only one known species, Ophiopetra lithographica.

== Taxonomic history ==
Both Ophiopetra and O. lithographica were first described by Raymond Enay and Hans Hess in 1962, who determined that the genus belonged to the order Chilophiurida Matsumoto, 1915 (later known as the infraorder Chilophiurina) and that it was related to the families Ophiodermatidae and Ophiochitonidae. In 1965, Hess then showed that the genus Aplocoma d'Orbigny, 1852 was related to Ophiopetra, and proposed a new family, Aplocomidae Hess, 1965, for the two genera. In 2008, Ophiopetra and another genus, Ophiohybris Hess, 1964, were placed in a new subfamily, Ophiopetrinae Hess & Meyer, 2008, within Aplocomidae.

Apart from O. lithographica, two further species, O. bathonica Hess, 1964 and O. oertii Hess, 1965, were formerly included in Ophiopetra; in 2013, these two species were both transferred to the new genus Eozonella Thuy, Marty & Comment, 2013.
