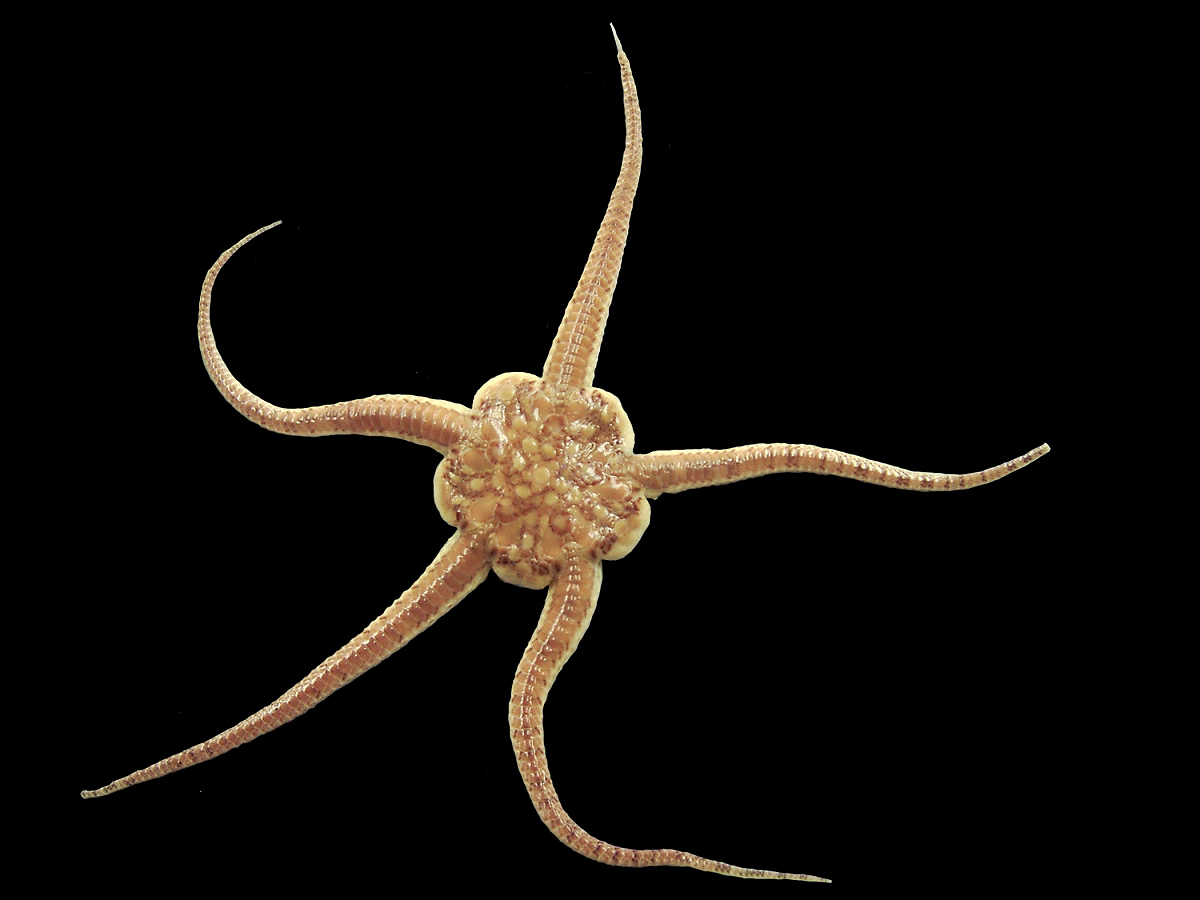
- O. ophiura

Scientific classification
- Kingdom: Animalia
- Phylum: Echinodermata
- Class: Ophiuroidea
- Order: Ophiurida
- Family: Ophiuridae
- Subfamily: Ophiurinae
- Genus: Ophiura; Lamarck, 1801

Species
- See text

= Ophiura =

Ophiura Temporal range: Early Paleocene to present

Genus of brittle stars

Ophiura is a genus of echinoderms belonging to the family Ophiuridae.

The genus has cosmopolitan distribution.

== Taxonomy ==
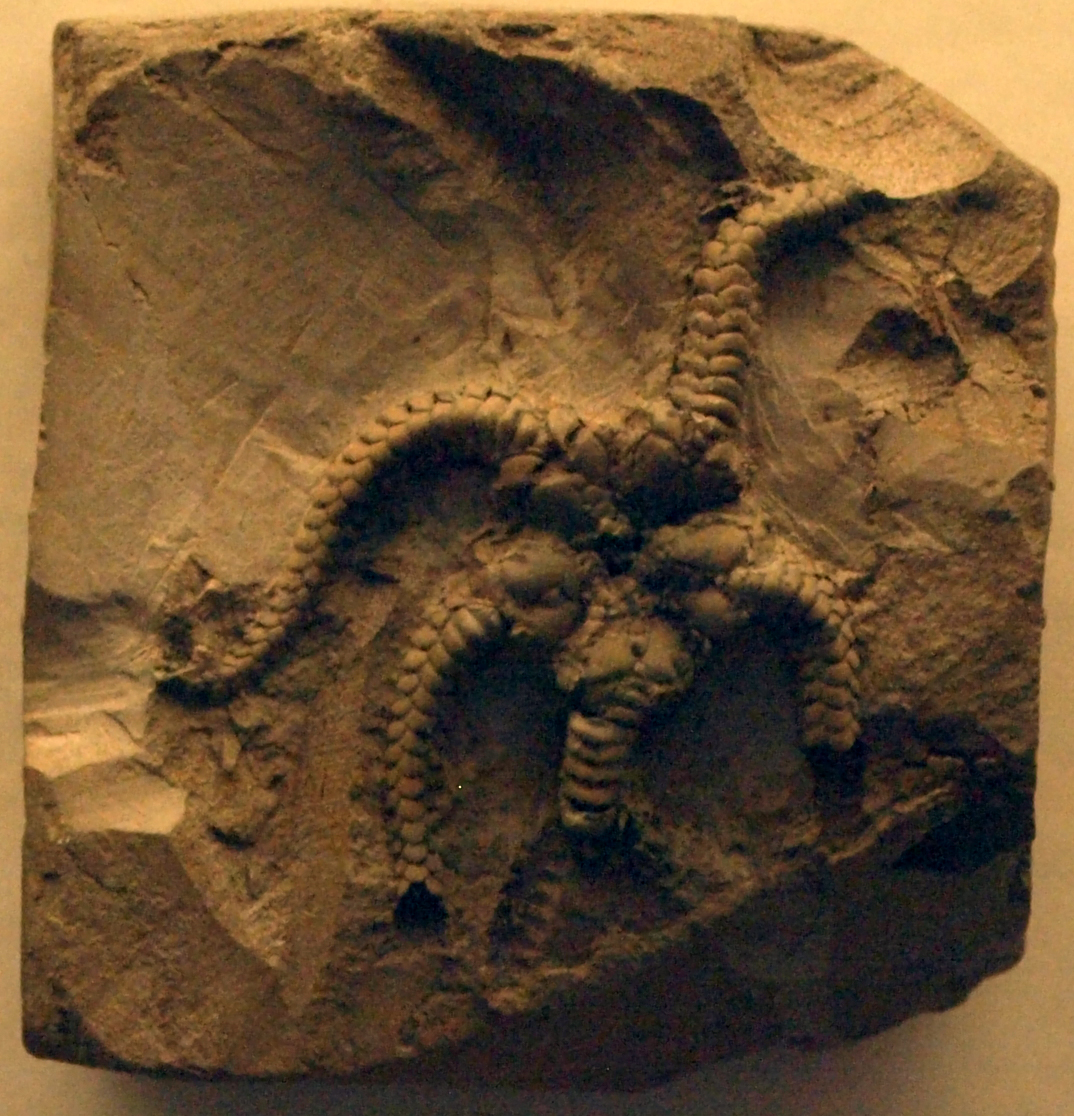
Fossil of O. wetherelli from the London Clay (Natural History Museum, London)

The following extant species are known:

- Ophiura acervata (Lyman, 1869)
- Ophiura aequalis (Lyman, 1878)
- Ophiura albata (Lyman, 1878)
- Ophiura albida Forbes, 1839
- Ophiura amphitrites (Bell, 1888)
- Ophiura annulata Quenstedt, 1876
- Ophiura anoidea H.L. Clark, 1923
- Ophiura atacta H.L. Clark, 1911
- Ophiura bathybia H.L. Clark, 1911
- Ophiura caledonica (Koehler, 1907)
- Ophiura calyptolepis H.L. Clark, 1911
- Ophiura carnea Lütken, 1858
- Ophiura carpelloides Rasmussen, 1972
- Ophiura clemens (Koehler, 1904)
- Ophiura crassa Mortensen, 1936

- Ophiura cryptolepis H.L. Clark, 1911
- Ophiura ctenophora (H.L. Clark, 1909)
- Ophiura cunliffei (Forbes, 1846)
- Ophiura elongata Say, 1825
- Ophiura estarensis Barbier, Debelmas & Latreille, 1957
- Ophiura falcifera (Lyman, 1869)
- Ophiura fallax Cherbonnier, 1959
- Ophiura figurata
- Ophiura flagellata (Lyman, 1878)
- Ophiura flexibilis (Koehler, 1911)
- Ophiura floscellata Hertz, 1926
- Ophiura fluctuans Koehler, 1922
- Ophiura fraterna (Lyman, 1878)
- Ophiura gagara Djakonov, 1949
- Ophiura grubei Heller, 1863
- Ophiura imbecillis (Lyman, 1878)
- Ophiura imprudens (Koehler, 1906)
- Ophiura indica (Brock, 1888)
- Ophiura innoxia (Koehler, 1906)
- Ophiura integra
- Ophiura kofoidi McClendon, 1909
- Ophiura koreni Jarshinsky
- Ophiura kunradeca Berry, 1938
- Ophiura kurilensis Baranova
- Ophiura lanceolata H.L. Clark, 1939
- Ophiura lenticularis (Koehler, 1908)
- Ophiura leptoctenia H.L. Clark, 1911
- Ophiura lienosa (Lyman, 1878)
- Ophiura ljungmani (Lyman, 1878)
- Ophiura luetkenii (Lyman, 1860)
- Ophiura lutkeni (Lyman, 1860)
- Ophiura maculata (Ludwig, 1886)
- Ophiura micracantha H.L. Clark, 1911
- Ophiura migrans
- Ophiura mimaria (Koehler, 1908)
- Ophiura minuta Risso, 1826
- Ophiura mitescens Koehler, 1922
- Ophiura monostoecha H.L. Clark, 1911
- Ophiura mundata (Koehler, 1906)
- Ophiura nana (Lütken & Mortensen, 1899)
- Ophiura neglecta Johnston, 1935
- Ophiura nitida Mortensen, 1933
- Ophiura olifex Quenstedt, 1876
- Ophiura ooplax (H.L. Clark, 1911)
- Ophiura ophiura (Linnaeus, 1758)
- Ophiura palliata (Lyman, 1878)
- Ophiura paucisquama Matsumoto, 1917
- Ophiura platyacantha McKnight, 2003
- Ophiura podica (Koehler, 1910)
- Ophiura prisca Goldfuss, 1833
- Ophiura pteracantha Liao, 1982
- Ophiura quadrispina H.L. Clark, 1911
- Ophiura robusta (Ayres, 1852)
- Ophiura rondeletii Risso, 1826
- Ophiura rouchi (Koehler, 1912)
- Ophiura sarsii Lütken, 1855
- Ophiura saurura (Verrill, 1894)
- Ophiura scutellata (Lütken & Mortensen, 1899)
- Ophiura scutulata Lütken & Mortensen, 1899
- Ophiura spinicantha McKnight, 2003
- Ophiura squamosa Baker, 1979
- Ophiura stellata (Studer, 1882)
- Ophiura stenobrachia H.L. Clark, 1917
- Ophiura tenera (Lyman, 1883)
- Ophiura tenorii (Delle Chiaje, 1825)
- Ophiura trimeni Bell, 1905
- Ophiura umitakamaruae Seno & Irimura, 1968
- Ophiura undulata (Lyman, 1878)
- Ophiura ventrocarinata Quenstedt, 1876
- Ophiura verrucosa (Studer, 1876)
- Ophiura violainae (Cherbonnier & Sibuet, 1972)
- Ophiura zebra Djakonov, 1954

=== Fossil species ===
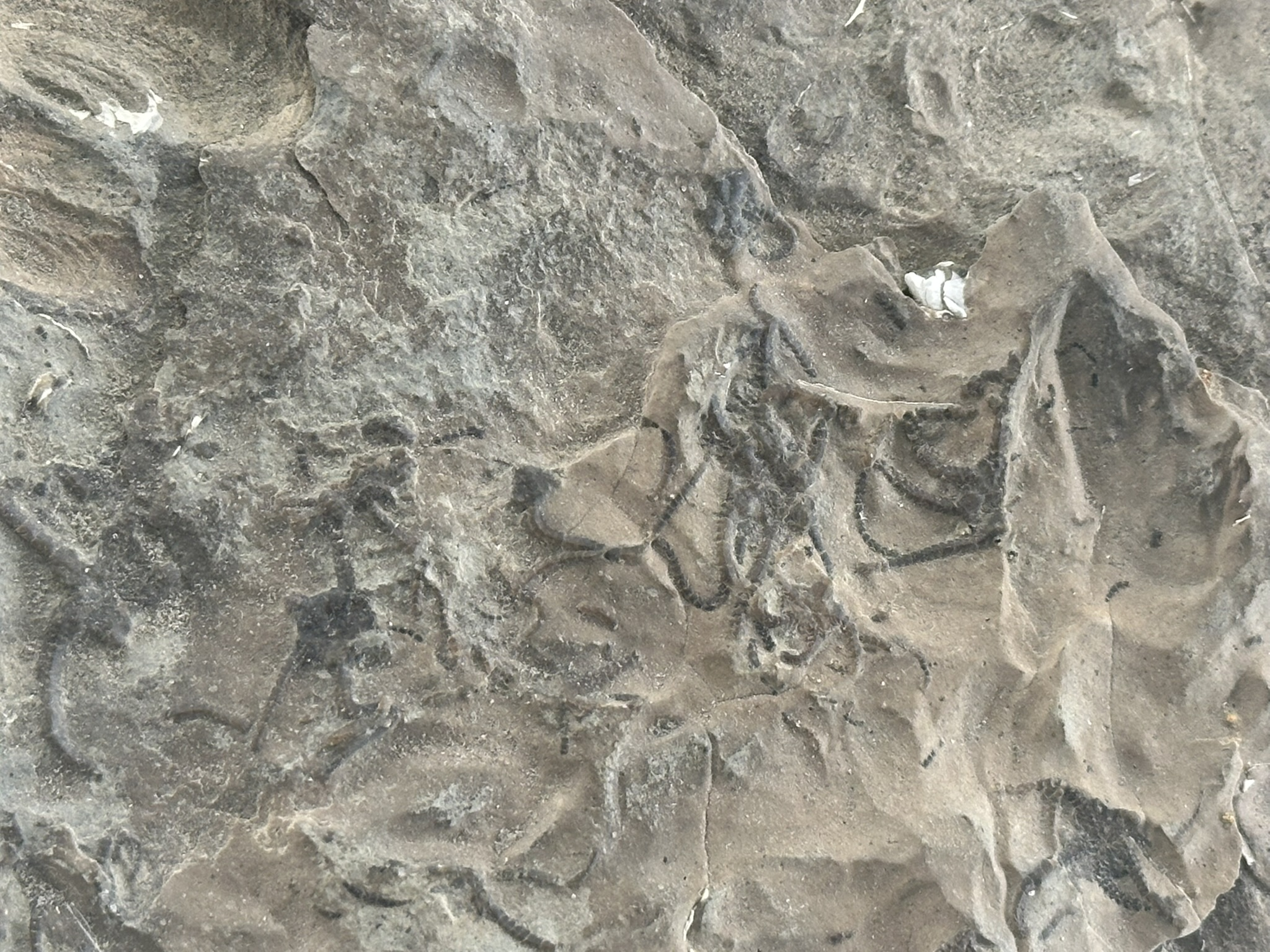
Fossilized assemblage of O. hendleri, from the La Meseta Formation of Antarctica (UIUC)

The following definitive fossil species are known. The genus dates back to at least the Early Paleocene with O. achatae:

- Ophiura achatae Rasmussen, 1972
- Ophiura bartonensis Rasmussen, 1972
- Ophiura bognoriensis Rasmussen, 1972
- Ophiura costata Rasmussen, 1972
- Ophiura furiae Rasmussen, 1972
- Ophiura hendleri Blake & Aronson, 1998
- Ophiura marylandica Berry, 1934
- Ophiura paucilepis Stöhr, Jagt & Klompmaker, 2011
- Ophiura pohangensis Ishida et al., 2022
- ?Ophiura sternbergica Kutscher, 1981
- Ophiura wetherelli (Forbes, 1852)

==== Former fossil species ====
The following species, dating back to the Early Jurassic, were originally placed in Ophiura but are now thought to belong to a different subdivision, or are at least known to not actually belong to the genus:

- Ophiura astonensis Hess, 1964
- Ophiura bridgerensis (Meek, 1873)
- Ophiura cretacea Guéranger, 1853
- Ophiura graysonensis (Alexander, 1931)
- Ophiura davisi Rasmussen, 1972
- Ophiura parviformis Küpper, 1954
- Ophiura straini Cornell, Lemone & Norland, 1991
- Ophiura texana (Clark, 1893)
- Ophiura tinurtiensis Valette, 1929
- Ophiura travisana Berry, 1941
- Ophiura utahensis (Clark & Twitchell, 1915)
- Ophiura vindobonensis Küpper, 1954
