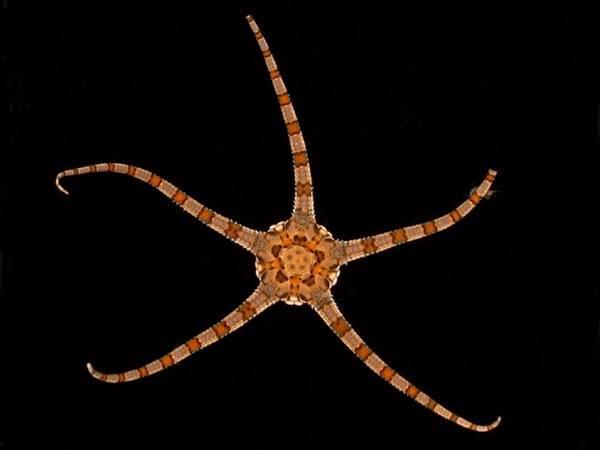

Scientific classification
- Kingdom: Animalia
- Phylum: Echinodermata
- Class: Ophiuroidea
- Order: Amphilepidida
- Family: Ophiolepididae
- Genus: Ophiolepis
- Species: O. elegans

Binomial name
- Ophiolepis elegans Lütken, 1859

= Ophiolepis elegans =

Species of brittle star

Ophiolepis elegans, commonly known as the elegant brittle star or the rosette-scale brittle star, is a species of brittle star in the family Ophiolepididae.

== Description ==
O. elegans has a relatively large and round central disc that can grow up to 2.5 cm (1 in) wide. The arm span can reach up to 19 cm (7.5 in) wide.

The scale pattern on the disc is one of the most distinguishable features of the brittle star. The disc has scales in a rosette pattern where one central scale is surrounded by five larger scales in a regular and continuous pattern that radiates from the center. On the bottom side of the disc is the mouth with five triangular sections making up the jaw, surrounded by oral papillae. Five short and narrow arms come off of the disc, and are covered in large scales. Where each arm meets the disc are two large scales, and in between each arm is another large scale. The dorsal side of the brittle star is typically brown or tan, but may be reddish orange. The center of the disc may have a lighter colored spot. The arms have a banded pattern. The oral side is a lighter beige.

== Distribution ==
O. elegans can be found from Cape Hatteras in North Carolina, United States to Brazil, including throughout the Gulf of Mexico. Within this range, the brittle star prefers to live in sandy substrates.
