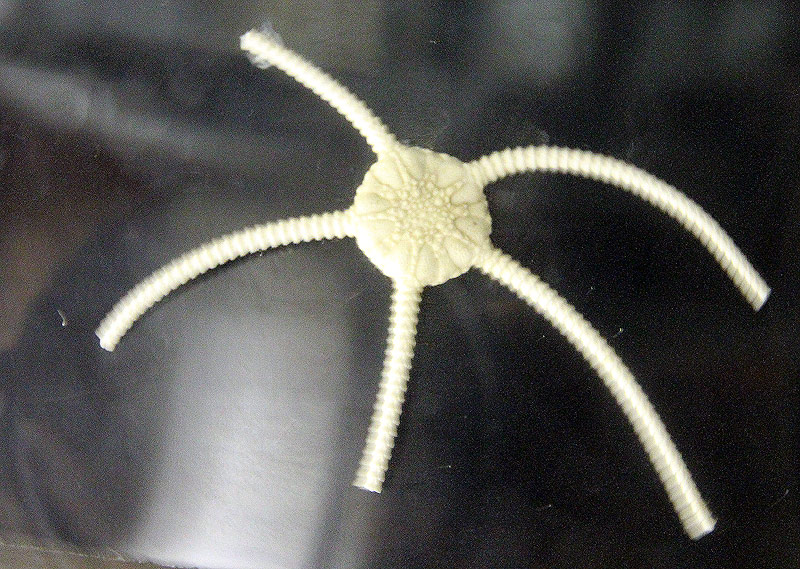
- Ophiomusium lymani

Scientific classification
- Kingdom: Animalia
- Phylum: Echinodermata
- Class: Ophiuroidea
- Order: Ophiurida
- Family: Ophiosphalmidae
- Genus: Ophiomusium; Lyman, 1869

= Ophiomusium =

Ophiomusium Temporal range: 114–0 Ma Early Cretaceous to Present

Genus of brittle stars

Ophiomusium is a genus of brittle stars. Fossils have been found dating to the Early Cretaceous (Late Aptian).

== Species ==
Species:

- Ophiomusium biconcavum Kutscher & Jagt, 2000
- Ophiomusium calathospongum Berry, 1939
- Ophiomusium dizluense Kristan-Tollmann, Tollmann & Hamedani, 1979
- Ophiomusium eburneum Lyman, 1869
- Ophiomusium fitchii (Spencer, 1907)
- Ophiomusium granulosum (Roemer, 1840)
- Ophiomusium longecombense Hess, 1965
- Ophiomusium lux Jagt, 2000
- Ophiomusium murravii (Forbes, 1843)
- Ophiomusium praecisum Hess, 1966
- Ophiomusium ramsayi (Wright, 1866)
- Ophiomusium rugosum Valette, 1915
- Ophiomusium sentum Kutscher & Jagt, 2000
- Ophiomusium sinuatum Kutscher & Jagt, 2000
- Ophiomusium solodurense Hess, 1962
- Ophiomusium stephensoni Berry, 1942
- Ophiomusium vermiculatum Valette, 1915
- Ophiomusium weymouthiense (Damon, 1880)
