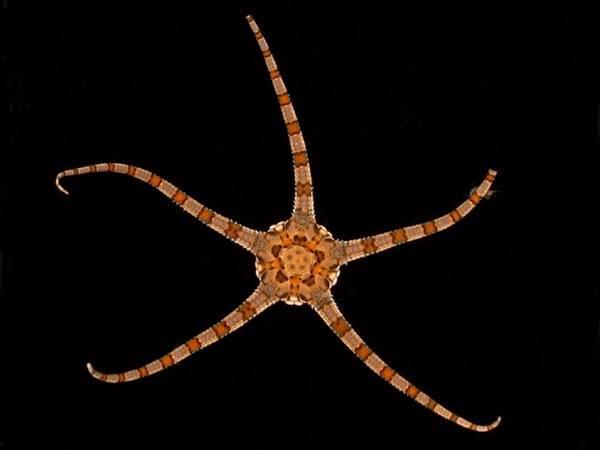
- Ophiolepis elegans

Scientific classification
- Kingdom: Animalia
- Phylum: Echinodermata
- Class: Ophiuroidea
- Order: Amphilepidida
- Family: Ophiolepididae
- Genus: Ophiolepis; Müller & Troschel, 1840

= Ophiolepis =

Genus of brittle stars

Ophiolepis is a genus of brittle stars in the family Ophiolepididae, the family in which it is the type genus. The type species of the genus is Ophiolepis superba, though the original type species was Ophiura annulosa, which is now accepted as Ophiomastix annulosa.

== Description ==
Brittle stars in the genus Ophiolepis have a disk that is covered in circular shields. The larger of these shields are surrounded by belts of smaller ones. At the base of the base of each of the five arms are small notches in the disk. Arm spines are arranged along the outer edge of the side arm plates. Species within Ophiolepis can have a variety of colors.

== List of species ==
There are currently 26 accepted species described within Ophiolepis:

- Ophiolepis aemulata (Pineda-Enriquez et al., 2018)
- Ophiolepis affinis (Studer, 1882)
- Ophiolepis ailsae (Hendler & Turner, 1987)
- Ophiolepis barbarae (Boone, 1928)
- Ophiolepis biscalata (McKnight, 2003)
- Ophiolepis buitronae (Pineda-Enriquez et al., 2018)
- Ophiolepis cardioplax (Murakami, 1943)
- Ophiolepis cavitata (Okanishi & Fujita, 2018)
- Ophiolepis crassa (Nielsen, 1932)
- Ophiolepis crebra (Pineda-Enriquez et al., 2018)
- Ophiolepis elegans (Lütken, 1859)
- Ophiolepis fulva (H.L. Clark, 1940)
- Ophiolepis gemma (Hendler & Turner, 1987)
- Ophiolepis grisea (H.L. Clark, 1940)
- Ophiolepis impressa (Lütken, 1859)
- Ophiolepis irregularis (Brock, 1888)
- Ophiolepis kieri (Hendler, 1979)
- Ophiolepis nodosa (Duncan, 1887)
- Ophiolepis pacifica (Lütken, 1856)
- Ophiolepis paucispina (Say, 1825)
- Ophiolepis pawsoni (Hendler, 1988)
- Ophiolepis plateia (Ziesenhenne, 1940)
- Ophiolepis rugosa (Koehler, 1898)
- Ophiolepis superba (H.L. Clark, 1915)
- Ophiolepis unicolor (H.L. Clark, 1938)
- Ophiolepis variegata (Lütken, 1856)
