= Ophiolepididae =

Ophiolepididae Temporal range: 365.2–0 Ma Late Devonian to Present
- Ophiolepis elegans

Scientific classification
- Kingdom: Animalia
- Phylum: Echinodermata
- Class: Ophiuroidea
- Order: Amphilepidida
- Superfamily: Ophiolepidoidea
- Family: Ophiolepididae; Ljungman, 1867

Type genus
- Ophiolepis Müller & Troschel, 1840

Genera
- 9, see text

Synonyms
- Ophiolepidae; Ophiolepidinae Ljungman, 1867

Family of brittle stars

Ophiolepididae is a family of brittle stars in the superfamily Ophiolepidoidea of the order Amphilepidida. It includes both deep-sea and shallow-water species. The earliest fossils from this family (Stephanoura belgica†) date back to the Late Famennian in the Late Devonian. (Note: The source lists the species under Ophiurinidae but the species has since been classified under Amphilepidida>Ophionereidina>Ophiolepididae.)

== Taxonomy ==
The phylogenetic tree per O'Hara et al. (2017) is as follows.

- - Ophionereidina
    - Ophionereidoidea
      - Ophionereididae
      - Amphilimnidae
    - Ophiolepidoidea
      - Hemieuryalidae
      - Ophiolepididae

The family includes the following genera.

- Archaeophiomusium† Hattin, 1967
- Eozonella† Thuy, Marty & Comment, 2013
- Geocoma† d'Orbigny, 1850
- Mesophiomusium† Kutscher & Jagt, 2000
- Ophiolepis Müller & Troschel, 1840
- Ophiopetra† Hess in Enay & Hess, 1962
- Ophioteichus H.L. Clark, 1938
- Ophiotypa Koehler, 1897
- Stephanoura† Ubaghs, 1941
