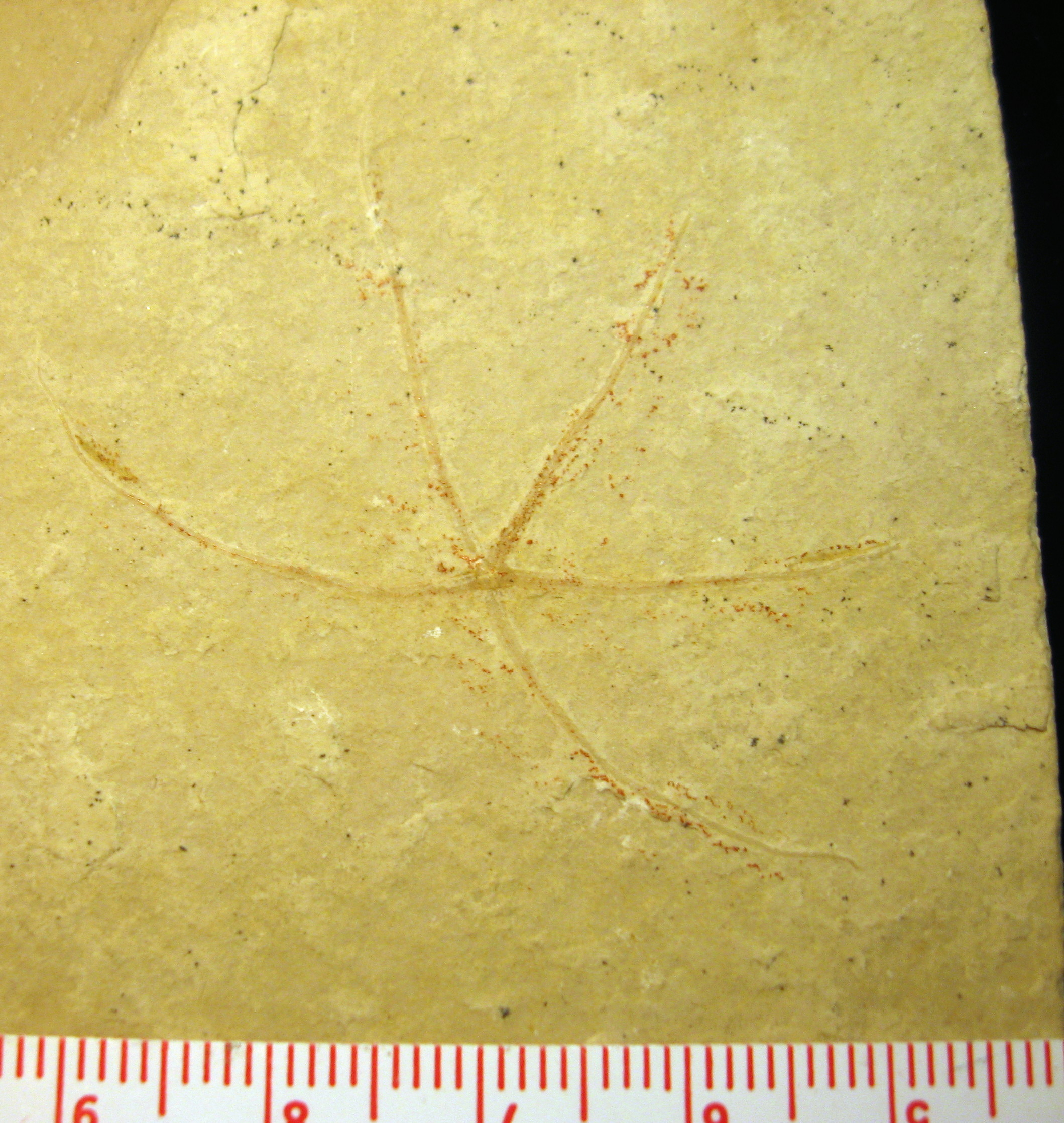
- Geocoma carinata fossil

Scientific classification
- Kingdom: Animalia
- Phylum: Echinodermata
- Class: Ophiuroidea
- Order: Amphilepidida
- Family: Ophiolepididae
- Genus: †Geocoma d'Orbigny, 1850

= Geocoma =

Geocoma Temporal range: Jurassic

Extinct genus of brittle stars

Geocoma is an extinct genus of brittle stars that lived in the Jurassic. Its fossils are known from Europe.
