= Odostomia victoriae =

Scientific classification
- Kingdom: Animalia
- Phylum: Mollusca
- Class: Gastropoda
- Family: Pyramidellidae
- Genus: Odostomia
- Species: O. victoriae

Binomial name
- Odostomia victoriae Gatliff & Gabriel, 1911

Species of gastropod

Odostomia victoriae is a species of sea snail, a marine gastropod mollusc in the family Pyramidellidae, the pyramids and their allies.
