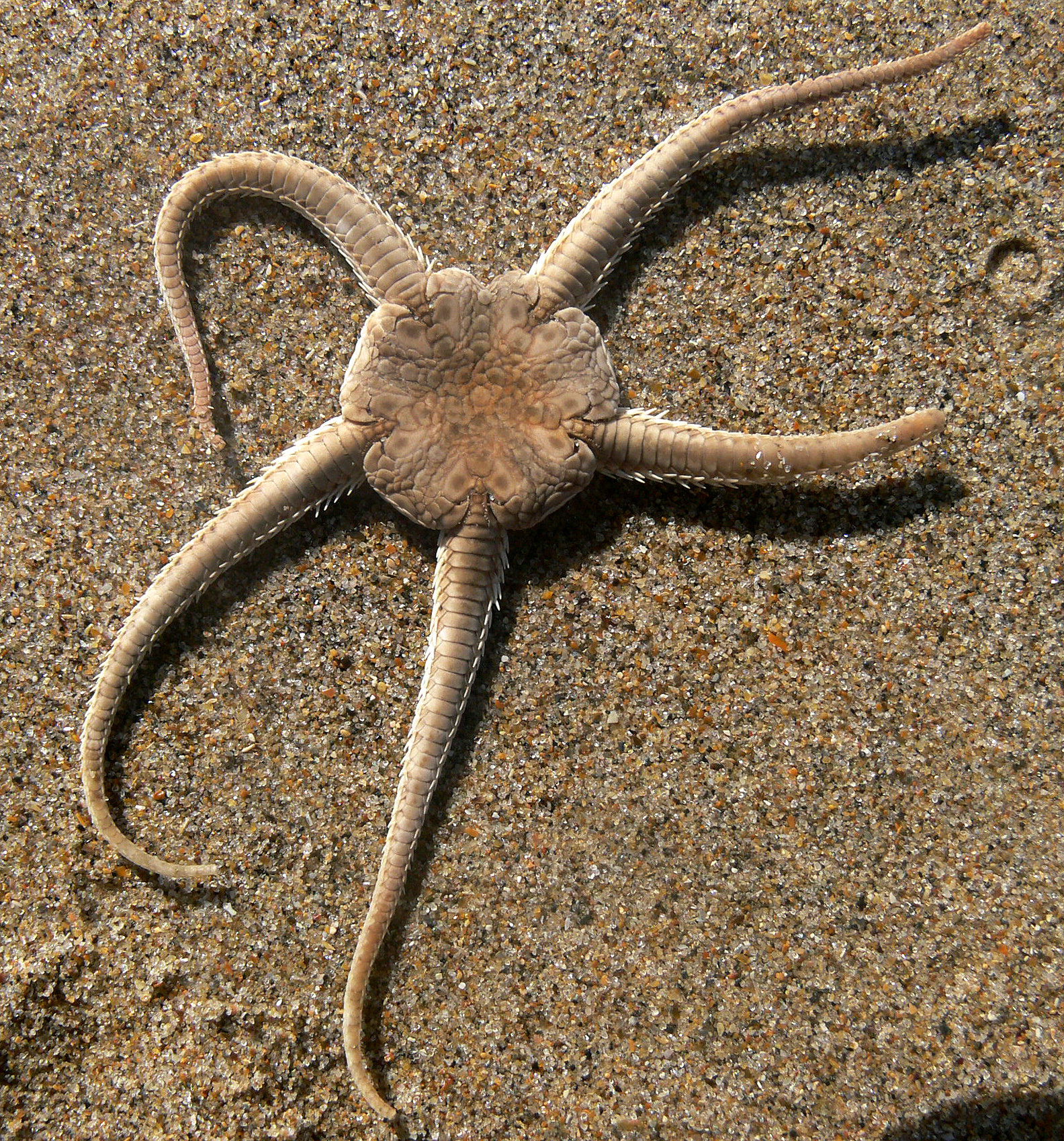
- Arm partly regenerated

Scientific classification
- Kingdom: Animalia
- Phylum: Echinodermata
- Class: Ophiuroidea
- Order: Ophiurida
- Family: Ophiuridae
- Genus: Ophiura
- Species: O. ophiura

Binomial name
- Ophiura ophiura Linnaeus, 1758

Synonyms
- Asterias ciliata(O.F. Müller, 1776); Asterias ophiura (Linnaeus, 1758); Ophioglypha texturata (Lamarck, 1816); Ophiura ciliaris (Lamarck, 1816); Ophiura ciliata (Bruzelius in Retzius, 1783); Ophiura textura (Linnaeus, 1758); Ophiura texturata (Lamarck, 1816)

= Ophiura ophiura =

Ophiura ophiura Temporal range: Late Pliocene to present

Species of brittle star

Ophiura ophiura or the serpent star is a species of brittle star in the order Ophiurida. It is typically found on coastal seabeds around northwestern Europe.

== Description ==
Ophiura ophiura has a circular central disc up to 35 mm (1.5 in) wide and five radially arranged, narrow arms each up to 140 mm (6 in) long. The general colour is mottled reddish-brown with a paler underside. Both the top and the underside of the disc are covered with calcareous plates. The arms are joined to the top rather than the edge of the disc and further small, articulating plates allow the arms to bend from side to side. Small spines on the arms lie flat against the surface. Four larger plates occur across the root of each arm with the outer pair having a comb-like edge, with 20 to 30 fine papillae in each. A pair of pores is seen between the underside plates at the root of the arms. Five large mouth-shield plates are on the underside of the disc which surround the central mouth. The teeth are in a vertical row above each of the five jaws, and about five mouth papillae are on each side of the jaw.

== Distribution and habitat ==
Ophiura ophiura is found on the sea floor in the northeast Atlantic Ocean and the North Sea from Norway and Sweden south to Madeira and the Mediterranean Sea. It is found below the low-tide mark in the neritic zone down about 200 m, on sandy bottoms. It shows a preference for sediments with a fine grain size and about 35% mud content. It is a common species, with 20 to 50 individuals occurring per square metre in some years in the North Sea.

== Biology ==
Ophiura ophiura is an active brittle star, moving with a jerky swimming action of its legs and sometimes burrowing. It is a filter feeder, feeding on a wide range of food, but also a bottom-feeding carnivore and detritivore. It can regenerate its arms if they are damaged or torn off.

Sexual reproduction takes place during the summer. The larvae are the typical ophiopluteus larvae of brittle stars and later settle on the sea bed and develop into juveniles.

== Ecology ==
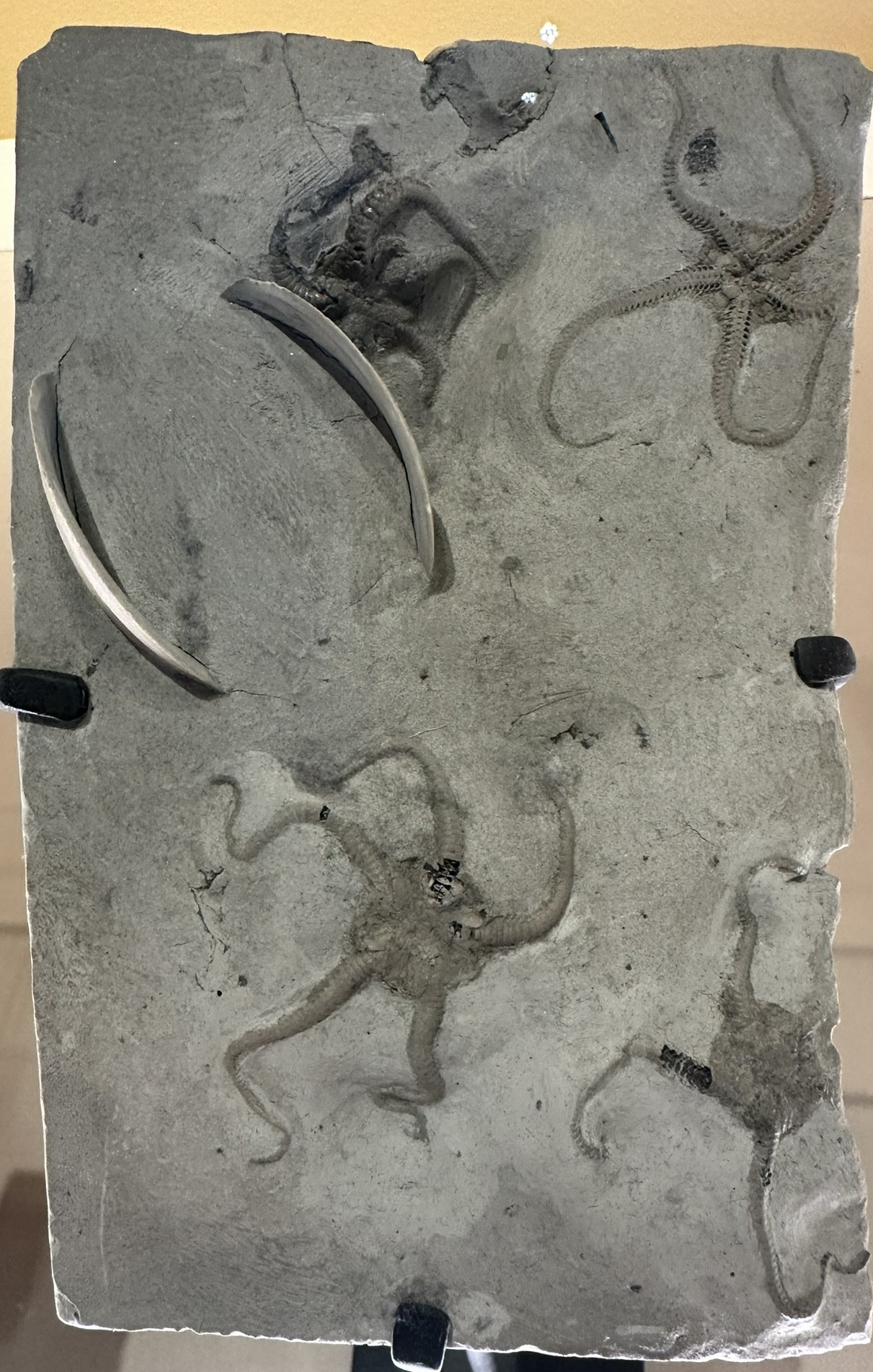
Fossil specimens of O. ophiura from Parma, Italy (Perot Museum)

The copepod, Parartotrogus richardi, is an ectoparasite of O. ophiura. In the Clyde sea fishery for scampi (Nephrops norvegicus) in Scotland, the unwanted invertebrates that get caught up in the trawl include O. ophiura, as well as the starfish Asterias rubens. A study undertaken to discover the survival rate of these animals when discarded and returned to the water found that uninjured A. rubens had a mortality rate of 4%, whereas virtually all the O. ophiura died within 14 days, even when they were returned to the sea immediately after being caught.

Another study examined the rate at which the discarded invertebrates sank to the bottom and their ultimate fates. O. ophiura sank relatively slowly and was preyed upon by seabirds, and the arms were eaten by fish. On the sea bed, a succession of benthic scavengers thrived on their remains, with crangonid shrimps and crabs such as Carcinus maenas and Liocarcinus depurator being prominent. In six hours, little remained except the limbs of crustaceans and the discs of ophiuroids. The crab Pagurus bernhardus was the most likely scavenger to consume O. ophiura in baited traps.

== Evolution ==
Extremely well-preserved fossils of Ophiura ophiura (=Ophiura texturata) have been recorded from a Late Pliocene and early Pleistocene-aged fossil assemblage near Parma, Italy. They inhabited an offshore ecosystem off the paleo-Adriatic Sea between hypoxia events; during hypoxia events, they are replaced in the assemblage by the more tolerant Ophiura albida.
