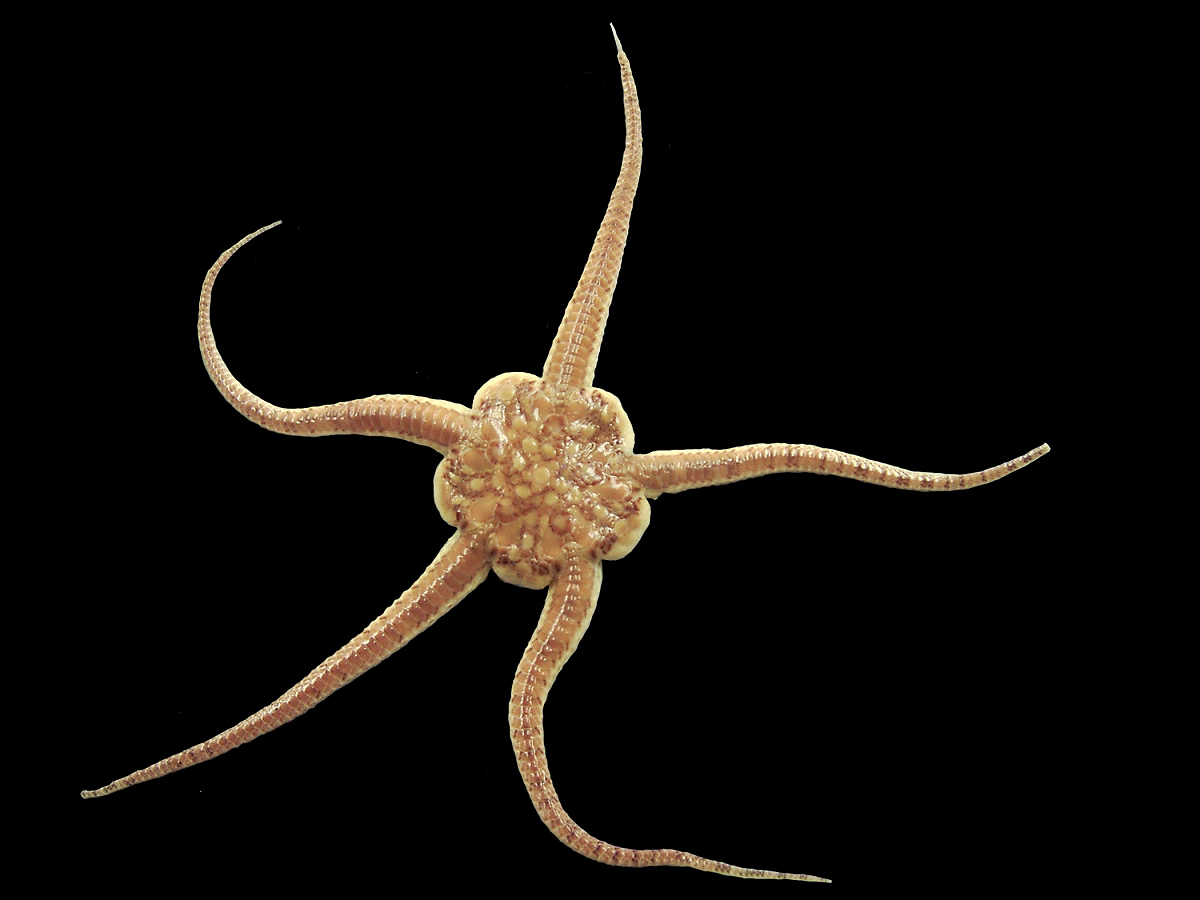
- Ophiura ophiura

Scientific classification
- Kingdom: Animalia
- Phylum: Echinodermata
- Class: Ophiuroidea
- Order: Ophiurida
- Suborder: Ophiurina
- Family: Ophiuridae; Müller and Troschel, 1840

Genera
- 10, see text

Synonyms
- Chilophiurina Matsumoto, 1915

= Ophiuridae =

Ophiuridae Temporal range: 259.8–0 Ma Late Permian to Present

Family of brittle stars

Ophiuridae is a family of brittle stars of the suborder Ophiurina. The earliest fossil from this family (Syntomospina kaiyangensis†) dates back to the Wuchiapingian age of the Lopingian epoch in the Permian. (Note: The species is listed under Ophiurinidae but has since been moved to Ophiuridae.)

== Description ==
The arms are simple and unbranched, projecting from and well-fused to the edge of the disc. These arms move horizontally. The arm spines short and movable. They lie flat against the arms when stimulated, but held erect when the brittle star is at rest. Disc and arms are covered in naked, distinct scales. The scales are situated at both sides of the disc. The jaw is surrounded by a continuous series of mouth papillae. The base of the arm contains a single arm comb or an inner and outer arm comb.

== Taxonomy ==
The phylogenetic tree per O'Hara et al. (2017) is as follows.

- - Ophiurida
    - Ophiurina
      - - Ophiopyrgidae
        - Ophiuridae
      - Astrophiuridae
    - Ophiomusina
      - Ophiomusaidae
      - Ophiosphalmidae

There are 10 genera (5 extant and 5 extinct) in the family.

- Huangzhishania† Chen, Shi & Kaiho, 2004
- Ophioduplantiera† Thuy, Numberger-Thuy & Pineda-Enriquez, 2021
- Subfamily Ophiurinae Lyman, 1865
- Felderophiura† Jagt, 1991
- Hofmannistella† Detre, 1971
- Ophiocrossota H.L. Clark, 1928
- Ophiocten Lütken, 1855
- Ophioctenella Tyler, Paterson, Sibuet, Guille, Murton & Segonzac, 1995
- Ophionotus Bell, 1902
- Ophiura Lamarck, 1801
- Syntomospina† Morris, Rollins & Shaak, 1973
