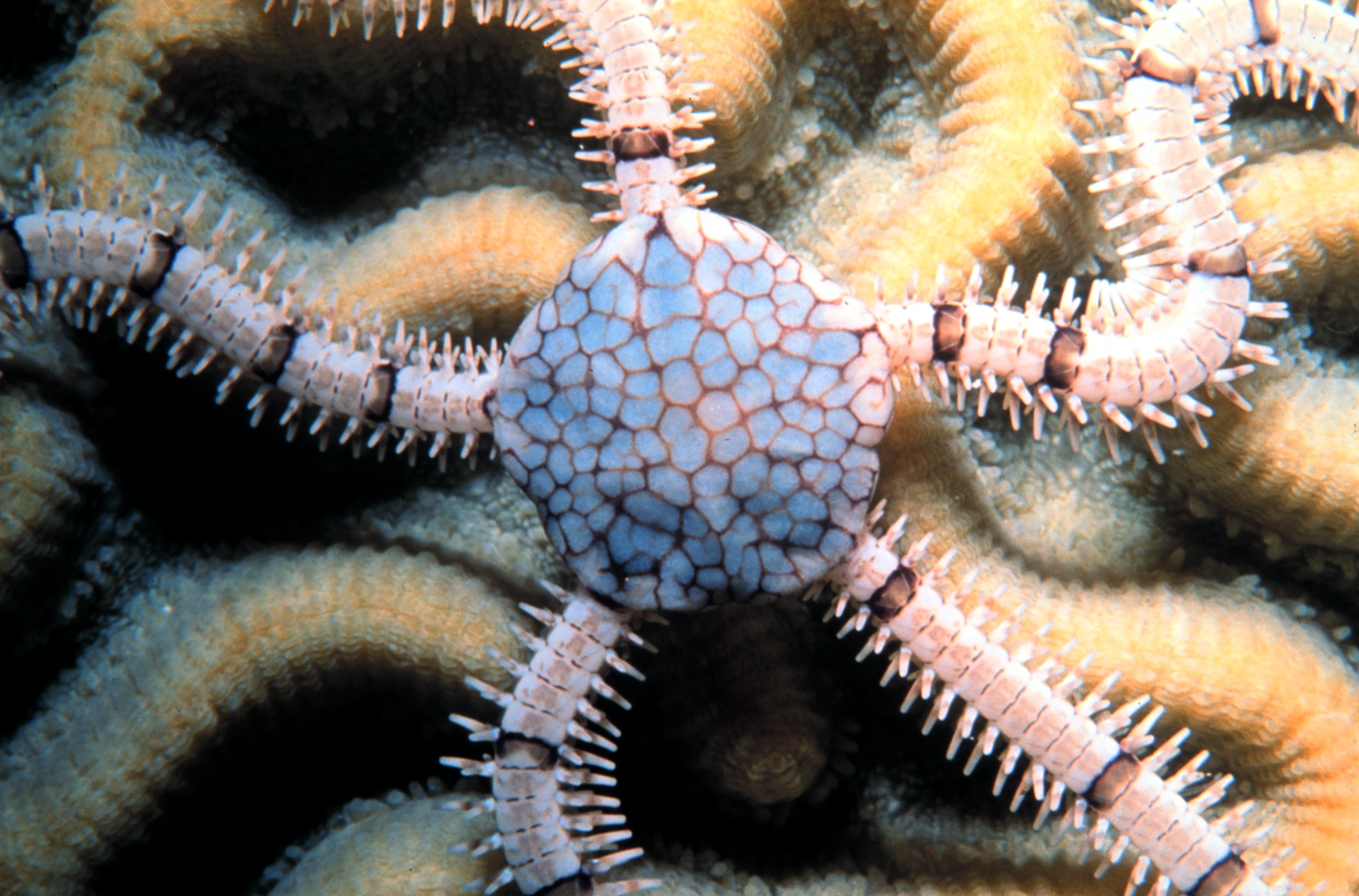
- Ophionereis reticulata

Scientific classification
- Kingdom: Animalia
- Phylum: Echinodermata
- Class: Ophiuroidea
- Order: Amphilepidida
- Superfamily: Ophionereidoidea
- Family: Ophionereididae; Ljungman, 1867

Type genus
- Ophionereis Lütken, 1859

Genera
- 7,see text

Synonyms
- Ophiochitonidae Matsumoto, 1915; Ophionereidae

= Ophionereididae =

Ophionereididae Temporal range: 237–0 Ma Late Triassic to Present

Family of brittle stars

Ophionereididae is a family of brittle stars in the suborder Ophionereidina of the order Amphilepidida. Fossils from this family have been found dating to the Late Carnian in Late Triassic.

== Taxonomy ==
Ophionereididae was previously placed in the superfamily Ophiocomidea and the now synonymized infraorder/suborder Chilophiurina. Following a major overhaul of higher taxonomy of Ophiuroidea in 2017 by O'Hara et al., it is now in the order Amphilepidida. The phylogenetic tree per O'Hara et al. (2017) is as follows.

- - Ophionereidina
    - Ophionereidoidea
      - Ophionereididae
      - Amphilimnidae
    - Ophiolepidoidea
      - Hemieuryalidae
      - Ophiolepididae

Ophionereididae contains the following seven genera

- Dermacantha† Thuy, 2013
- Eolaxoporus† Thuy, 2013
- Ophiochiton Lyman, 1878
- Ophiodoris Koehler, 1904
- Ophionereis Lütken, 1859
- Ophioneroides Cherbonnier & Guille, 1978
- Ophioplax Lyman, 1875
