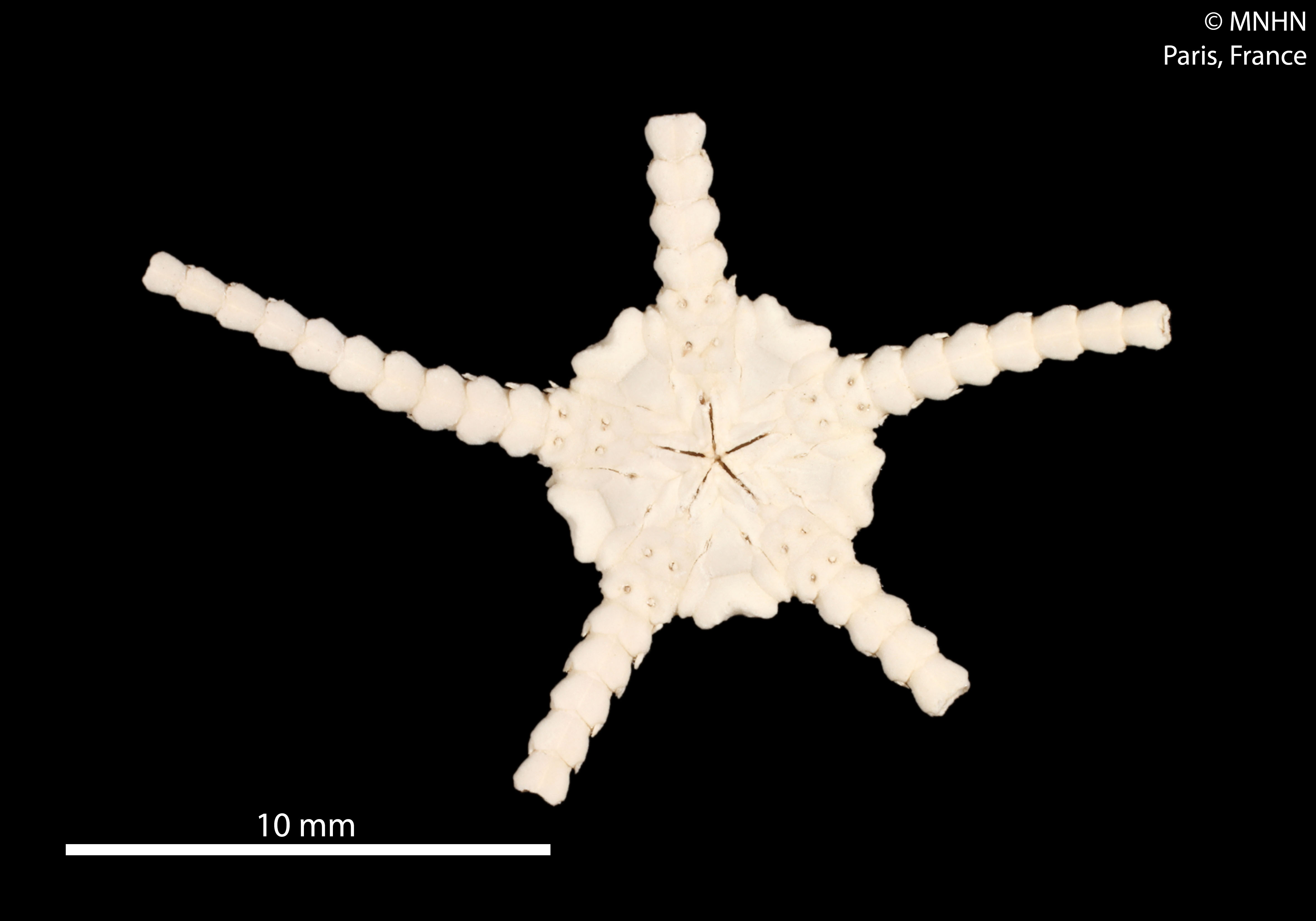
- Ophiomusa acufera

Scientific classification
- Kingdom: Animalia
- Phylum: Echinodermata
- Class: Ophiuroidea
- Order: Ophiurida
- Family: Ophiomusaidae
- Genus: Ophiomusa; Hertz, 1927

= Ophiomusa =

Genus of echinoderms

Ophiomusa is a genus of echinoderms, which includes sea urchins, sand dollars and sea cucumbers, belonging to the family Ophiolepididae. Ophiurida are similar to starfish; they both have a central disc and five arms sprouting from the disc. One of the main distinguishing factors of an Ophiuroid is its arms; the arms of an Ophiurida are longer, thinner, and distinctly separated in comparison to those of a sea star.

== Description ==
Ophiuroids, also known as brittle stars, are relatively small. Brittle stars do not have a brain or eyes, but they do have a stomach, sex organs, and a mouth with five jaws. They have five long, thin, spiny arms made of calcium carbonate plates connected by a central disc; the size of their disk ranges from 6-12mm disc diameter (d.d.), and their arms range from sizes greater than 4 times d.d. in length. The first dorsal arm plates are in the shape of a trapezoid, the next dorsal arm changes to a triangular form and are each separated from each other. Their arms contribute to the star's “snake-like” movement across the bottom sediments as well as its feeding mechanisms. The mouth of an Ophiuroid is located on the oral surface which is facing down but is held off the sea floor. An interesting fact about Ophiuroids is that, like regular sea stars, they have the ability to regenerate a severed arm, they even possess the ability to cut off their own arm if necessary. This is referred to as autotomy (self-cut) which is how it got its name, brittle star. The spiny arms of the brittle star allow the animal to roam without losing grip from the substratum.

== Distribution ==
Ophiuroids are found through different regions and zones; they have been observed in sea floors in both tropic and polar regions. According to a NOAA dive report, there was a high density ophiuroids across the sedimented seafloor off the North Carolina coast and can also be seen along the Yucatán Peninsula. The genus has almost cosmopolitan distribution, but little is known about them.

== Reproduction ==
Ophiuroids can reproduce both asexually and sexually, but most reproduce sexually. Asexual reproduction happens when the disc is split in half, this process is called fission. Most species are hermaphrodites, which means that the animal has both male and female sex organs needed to reproduce. Brittle stars release eggs and sperm into the water, the larvae are called Ophioplutei. They settle in the seafloor and eventually form a brittle star. Ophiuroids reach full sexual maturity after about two years and their lifespans can be up to about five years.

== Life stages ==
When brittle stars sexually reproduce, their fertilized eggs float in the water and eventually develop into larvae. Ophioplutei feed on plankton. Brittle star larvae are small and mostly clear. These larvae then go through metamorphosis, this is the stage where they develop their five arms. These young brittle stars then move on to the settling stage where they sink to the bottom of the ecosystem where they will spend the rest of their life in.

== Diet ==
Ophiuroids are carnivorous and omnivorous, they use their arms to catch food particles in the water or even food along the seafloor. Their gut content varied based on where the brittle stars were placed: those living in shallow habitats mainly consumed plankton and macroalgae whereas those living in deep sea habitats mainly consumed brittle star fragments. In an experiment, it was observed that the main contents in six different brittle stars included macroalgae, diatoms, bivalves, gastropods, cyanobacteria, marine fungi, and even unidentified eggs (small organisms, brittle star fragments, and sponges).

Species:

- Ophiomusa acufera (Lyman, 1875)
- Ophiomusa africana (Koehler, 1909)
- Ophiomusa alecto (A.H. Clark, 1936)
- Ophiomusa alta (Koehler, 1904)
- Ophiomusa anaelisae (Tommasi & Abreu, 1974)
- Ophiomusa anisacantha (H.L. Clark, 1928)
- Ophiomusa aspera (Koehler, 1930)
- Ophiomusa australe (H.L. Clark, 1928)
- Ophiomusa binghami (Boone, 1928)
- Ophiomusa biporica (Castillo-Alárcon, 1968)
- Ophiomusa breve (H.L. Clark, 1939)
- Ophiomusa canaliculata (H.L. Clark, 1917)
- Ophiomusa constricta (Mortensen, 1936)
- Ophiomusa faceta (Koehler, 1922)
- Ophiomusa facunda (Koehler, 1922)
- Ophiomusa fallax (Koehler, 1904)
- Ophiomusa granosa (Lyman, 1878)
- Ophiomusa incerta (Koehler, 1930)
- Ophiomusa kimblae (Baker, 1979)
- Ophiomusa leptobrachia (H.L. Clark, 1941)
- Ophiomusa ligata (Koehler, 1922)
- Ophiomusa longispina (Koehler, 1930)
- Ophiomusa luetkeni (Lyman, 1878)
- Ophiomusa lunare (Lyman, 1878)
- Ophiomusa lymani (Wyville Thomson, 1873)
- Ophiomusa micropora (H.L. Clark, 1941)
- Ophiomusa miranda (Koehler, 1930)
- Ophiomusa moniliforme (H.L. Clark, 1941)
- Ophiomusa morio (Koehler, 1922)
- Ophiomusa muta (Hertz, 1927)
- Ophiomusa oligoplaca (H.L. Clark, 1915)
- Ophiomusa relicta (Koehler, 1904)
- Ophiomusa rosacea (A.H. Clark, 1936)
- Ophiomusa rugosa (Koehler, 1914)
- Ophiomusa scalare (Lyman, 1878)
- Ophiomusa simplex (Lyman, 1878)
- Ophiomusa stellata (Verrill, 1899)
- Ophiomusa testudo (Lyman, 1875)
- Ophiomusa tripassalota (H.L. Clark, 1917)
- Ophiomusa trychna (H.L. Clark, 1911)
- Ophiomusa ultima Hertz, 1927
- Ophiomusa valdiviae (Hertz, 1927)
- Ophiomusa valida (Ljungman, 1872)
- Ophiomusa zela (A.H. Clark, 1949)
