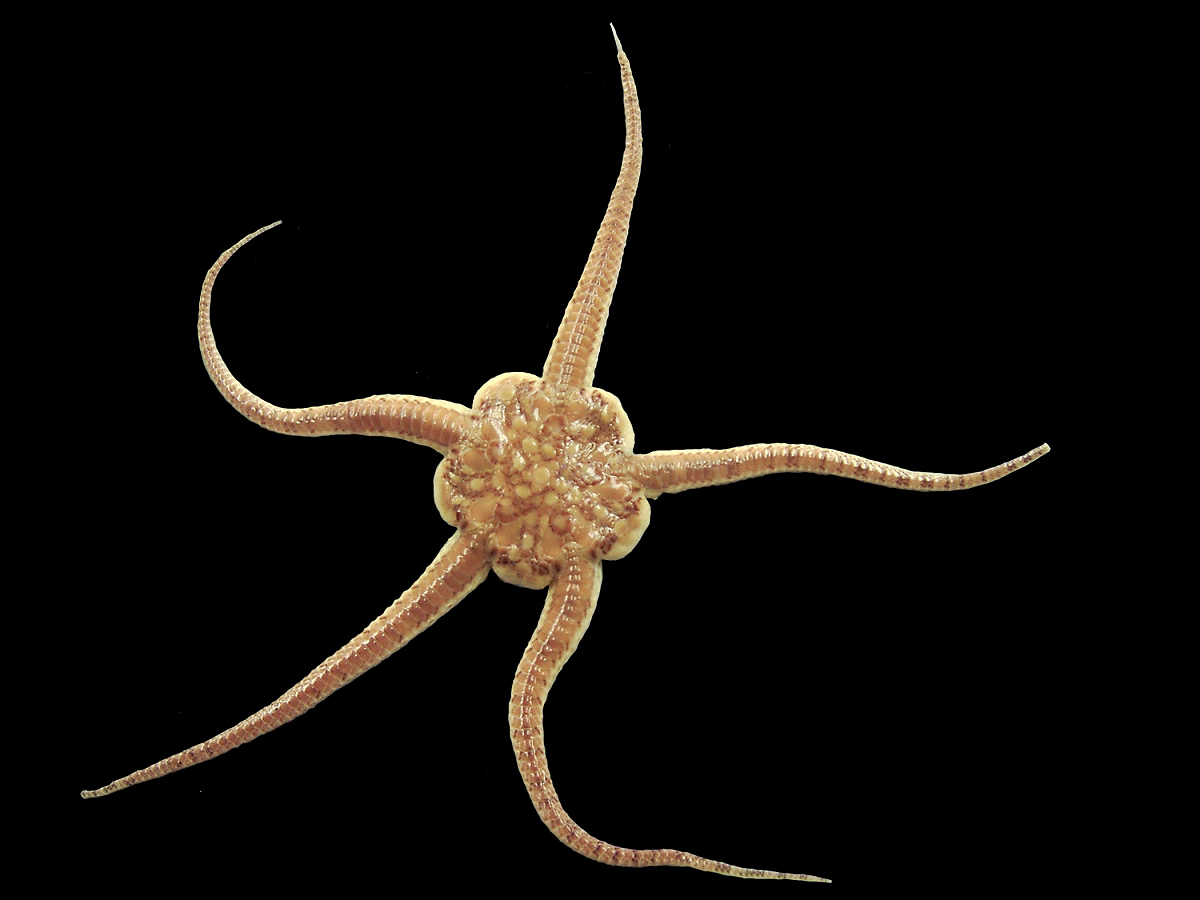
- Ophiura ophiura

Scientific classification
- Kingdom: Animalia
- Phylum: Echinodermata
- Class: Ophiuroidea
- Superorder: Euryophiurida
- Order: Ophiurida; Müller and Troschel, 1840 sensu O'Hara et al., 2017

Suborders
- Ophiomusina; Ophiurina

Synonyms
- Ophiurae

= Ophiurida =

Ophiurida Temporal range: 469.4–0 Ma Middle Ordovician to Present

Order of echinoderms

Ophiurida is an order of echinoderms within the class Ophiuroidea. Ophiurida have a world-wide distribution range and are found in oceans in different depths. Most of them are herbivores or detritus feeders. The earliest fossil from this order (Protaster†) dates back to the Darriwilian in the Middle Ordovician. (Note: The genus is listed under Oegophiurida but has since been moved to Ophiurida.)

== Characteristics ==
Ophiurida have bursae for respiration and excretion, and dorsal and ventral arm shields are present and usually well developed. Arms are unbranched and incapable of coiling vertically. Most are five-armed, some with 4 or 6 arms as an abnormality, but others properly bear six or seven arms. The madreporite is on the oral surface. The digestive glands are entirely within the central disc. They move their arms side to side by means of ball-and-socket joints. Tropical species tend to contrast color from the environment, but most others prefer to blend in. These biochromes do not include echinochromes.

== Taxonomy ==
The order has been divided into the suborders and infraorders by various taxonomists in the past. The latest accepted classification per O'Hara et al. (2017) is as follows:

- Suborder Ophiomusina O'Hara et al., 2017:
  - Ophiomusaidae O'Hara, Stöhr, Hugall, Thuy & Martynov, 2018
  - Ophiosphalmidae O'Hara, Stöhr, Hugall, Thuy & Martynov, 2018
- Suborder Ophiurina Müller & Troschel, 1840 sensu O'Hara et al., 2017:
  - Astrophiuridae Sladen, 1879
  - Ophiopyrgidae Perrier, 1893
  - Ophiuridae Müller & Troschel, 1840
- Genus Praeaplocoma† Broglio Loriga & Berti Cavicchi, 1972

There is also a suborder with 12 genera which is yet to be named.

- Suborder Ophiurida incertae sedis:
  - Anthophiura H.L. Clark, 1911
  - Bathylepta Belyaev & Litvinova, 1972
  - Haplophiura Matsumoto, 1915
  - Ophiochalcis Koehler, 1930
  - Ophiochrysis Koehler, 1904
  - Ophiochytra Lyman, 1880
  - Ophiomaria A.H. Clark, 1916
  - Ophiopenia H.L. Clark, 1911
  - Ophiotjalfa Mortensen, 1913
  - Ophiotrochus Lyman, 1878
  - Ophiuraster H.L. Clark, 1939
  - Uriopha Paterson, 1980

The phylogenetic tree per O'Hara et al. (2017) is as follows.

- - Ophiurida
    - Ophiurina
      - - Ophiopyrgidae
        - Ophiuridae
      - Astrophiuridae
    - Ophiomusina
      - Ophiomusaidae
      - Ophiosphalmidae
