= Histampica =

Scientific classification
- Kingdom: Animalia
- Phylum: Echinodermata
- Class: Ophiuroidea
- Order: Amphilepidida
- Family: Ophiothamnidae
- Genus: Histampica; A.M. Clark, 1970

Type species
- Histampica umbonata (Matsumoto, 1915)

Synonyms
- Amphiactis Matsumoto, 1915, non Verrill, 1869

Genus of brittle stars

Histampica is a genus of brittle stars in the family Ophiothamnidae. It was originally given the name Amphiactis and placed in the family Amphilepididae. In 1970, the name was found to be a taxonomic homonym of another genus, so it was renamed to Histampica. In 2018, it was transferred to the family Ophiothamnidae. The genus contains nine species, with Histampica umbonata as the type species.

== Species ==
Histampica contains the following species:

- Histampica canescens (Lyman, 1879)
- Histampica cythera (A.H. Clark, 1949)
- Histampica dissidens (Koehler, 1904)
- Histampica duplicata (Lyman, 1875)
- Histampica haimaensis Li, Li, Na, Han, Paterson, Liu, Zhang & Qiu, 2021
- Histampica lycidas (A.H. Clark, 1949)
- Histampica rugosa (H.L. Clark, 1941)
- Histampica sinica Liao, 2004
- Histampica umbonata (Matsumoto, 1915)
