= Gnathophiurina =

Gnathophiurina Temporal range: 149.2–0 Ma Late Jurassic to Present
- Amphipholis squamata

Scientific classification
- Kingdom: Animalia
- Phylum: Echinodermata
- Class: Ophiuroidea
- Order: Amphilepidida
- Suborder: Gnathophiurina; Matsumoto, 1915

Superfamilies
- Amphiuroidea; Ophiactoidea

Synonyms
- Gnathophiurida

Suborder of brittle stars

Gnathophiurina is a suborder of brittle stars in the order Amphilepidida. Fossils from this suborder (Amphiuridae) have been found dating back to the Tithonian in the Late Jurassic.

== Taxonomy ==
It was first described as a suborder by Matsumoto in 1915 in his first modern classification of brittle stars. It was also described as an infraorder of Ophiurina by Smith and Paterson in 1995.

In a major overhaul of Ophiuroidea higher taxonomy by O'Hara et al., in 2017, it was classified as a suborder (along with Ophionereidina and Ophiopsilina) in the order Amphilepidida and is now accepted as such. It contains two superfamilies.

- Amphiuroidea Ljungman, 1867
- Ophiactoidea Ljungman, 1867

The phylogenetic tree per O'Hara et al. (2017) is as follows.

- Gnathophiurina
  - - - Ophiactoidea
        - - - Ophiotrichidae
            - Ophiopholidae
          - - Ophiactidae
        - - Ophiothamnidae
    - Amphiuroidea
      - Amphiuridae
      - Amphilepididae
