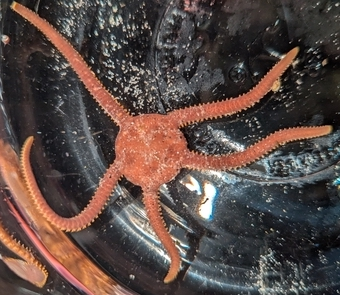

Scientific classification
- Kingdom: Animalia
- Phylum: Echinodermata
- Class: Ophiuroidea
- Order: Amphilepidida
- Family: Hemieuryalidae
- Genus: Ophioplocus
- Species: O. esmarki

Binomial name
- Ophioplocus esmarki Lyman, 1874

= Ophioplocus esmarki =

Species of brittle star

Ophioplocus esmarki, commonly known as Esmark's brittle star or the smooth brittle star, is a species of brittle star in the family Hemieuryalidae. It can be found from the low intertidal to a depth of 70 m, from Northern California to Baja California. This is one of the few brittle star species that is visible during daylight hours.

== Description ==
Esmark's brittle star is typically a gray-brown color. It has a round central disc, up to 22 mm in diameter, and five arms, up to 60 mm, each with very short spines.

== Natural history ==
Ophioplocus esmarki follows pattern of abbreviated development in which non-feeding larvae called vitellaria spend only a few days as free-swimming plankton before metamorphosing into a juveniles. Adults brood their embryos, vitellaria, and juveniles inside their genital bursae (pouches) located in the central disc. One study estimates that it takes 9 to 11 years for this species to reach 50% of its final body size.
