= Ophiozonella depressa =

Scientific classification
- Kingdom: Animalia
- Phylum: Echinodermata
- Class: Ophiuroidea
- Order: Amphilepidida
- Family: Hemieuryalidae
- Genus: Ophiozonella
- Species: O. depressa

Binomial name
- Ophiozonella depressa (Lyman, 1878)

Species of brittle star

Ophiozonella depressa is a species of brittle stars from the family Hemieuryalidae. This species is a type of echinoderm which lives in deep-sea benthic environments. First described by Theodore Lyman in 1878, and then later confirmed by H. Matsumoto in 1915.

== Distribution ==
O. depressa specimens have been found in benthic environments at depths of roughly 1-2 kilometers. There are currently 24 records of occurrences of this species from various locations including off the eastern coast of Tasmania, in the ocean near the northern coast of New Zealand, off the northwestern coast of Australia, in the Makassar Strait in Indonesia, and as far north as the southern coast of Taiwan.

== Anatomy ==
As with other species of Ophiuroidea, O. depressa have pentaradial symmetry with five arms extending from a central body disk. This species arms in particular have been recorded at roughly 37 mm and are thick at the base (1.8 mm) and taper to fine tip. The central body consists of both an oral and aboral side, with the aboral side featuring many calcareous plates of varying size which cover the aboral side. These plates are covered by the epidermis and are collectively called the "test". Other calcareous plates which are on the sides of the central body in between arms are known as radial shields. In O. depressa, these radial shields are no more than a single row of plates apart, and in most cases are touching. The connection between the arms and the central body also hold particularly large and rhomboidal arm shields on the aboral side. On the oral side, four short papillae ring the mouth on each side, and the mouth shields are longer and thinner. In between the arms on the oral side are irregular rows of uneven plates which lead up to the oral plates lining the mouth.

== Locomotion ==
While O. depressa have not been observed in the wild, they share common characteristics with their class Ophiuroidea. O. depressa have a water-vascular system which ends in tube feet, allowing them to use controlled water pressure to move the tube feet as well as draw in food, or excrete waste. The tube feet are then used to crawl along the sea floor in any direction or coil about objects in order to hold themselves in place.

== Digestion ==
The digestive system of O. depressa consists of papillae and teeth, which line the mouth, an esophagus, and a sac-like stomach which is connected to the mouth via the esophagus. Digestion occurs within the stomach and waste is then excreted back through the esophagus and out the mouth.

== Gas exchange ==
Internal sacs, or bursae, are contained within the central body and perform much of the gas exchange necessary. The bursae take in water through slits which run alongside the margins of the arms. The water then flows through the bursae and out of the oral end of the slit.

== Nervous System ==
The nervous system consists of a nerve ring and radial nerves which run along the epidermis. The sensory system consists entirely of epithelial sensory cells, with no sensory organs at all, so that the only sense is that of touch.

== Reproduction ==
O. depressa contain gonads, or genital bursae, as with other Ophiuroidea, but the specifics of sexual reproduction in the species have not been studied or observed. However, as with other members of Ophiuroidea, this species can undergo asexual reproduction in the form of regeneration of lost limbs and other internal structures.

The larval stage and other development of O. depressa has not yet been observed or studied.

== Diet ==
The diet of O. depressa is currently unknown or unstudied.
