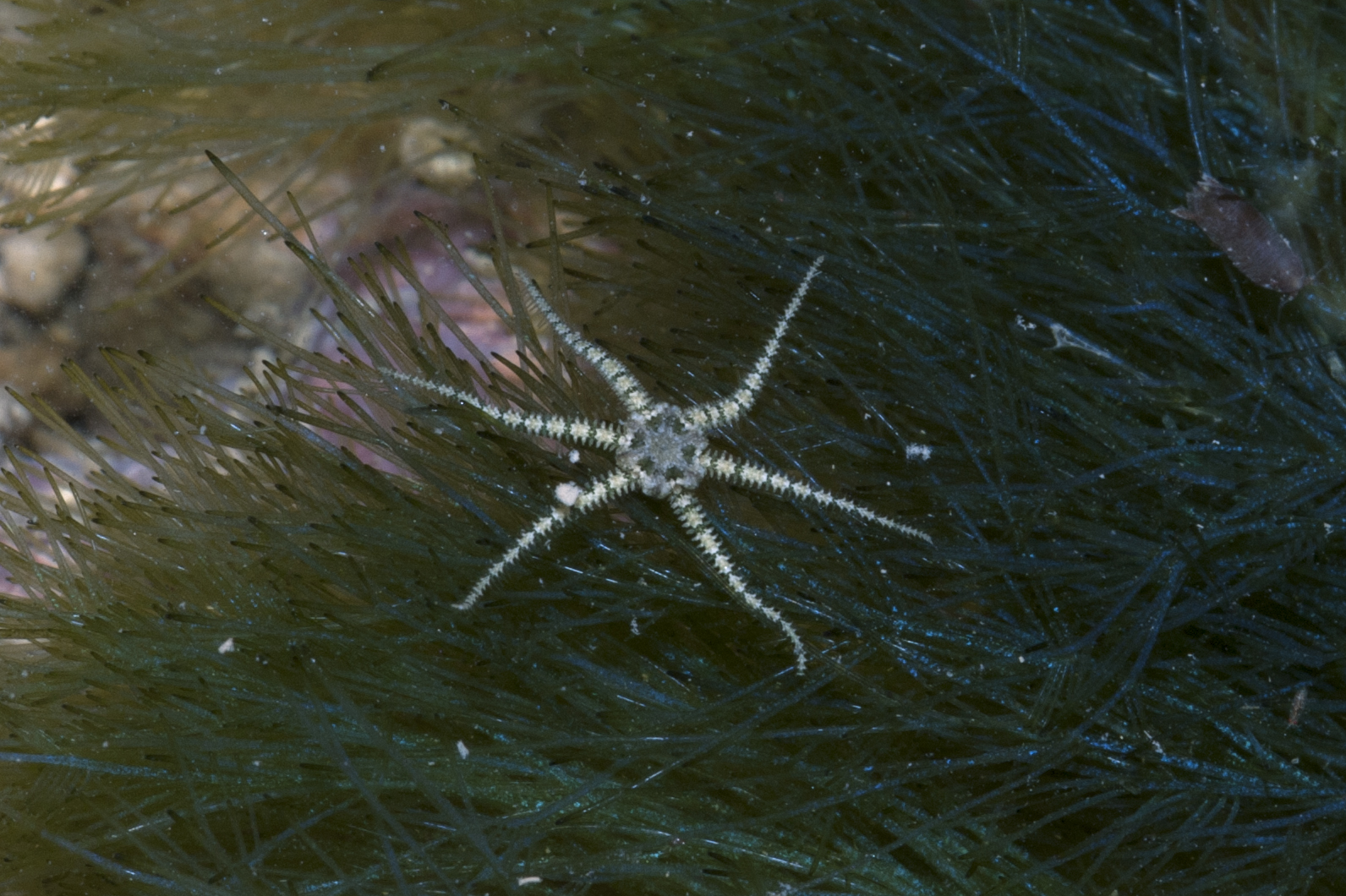
- Ophiactis savignyi

Scientific classification
- Kingdom: Animalia
- Phylum: Echinodermata
- Class: Ophiuroidea
- Order: Amphilepidida
- Family: Ophiactidae
- Genus: Ophiactis; Lütken, 1856

Species
- See text

= Ophiactis =

Genus of brittle stars

Ophiactis is a genus of brittle stars (Ophiuroidea).

== Species ==
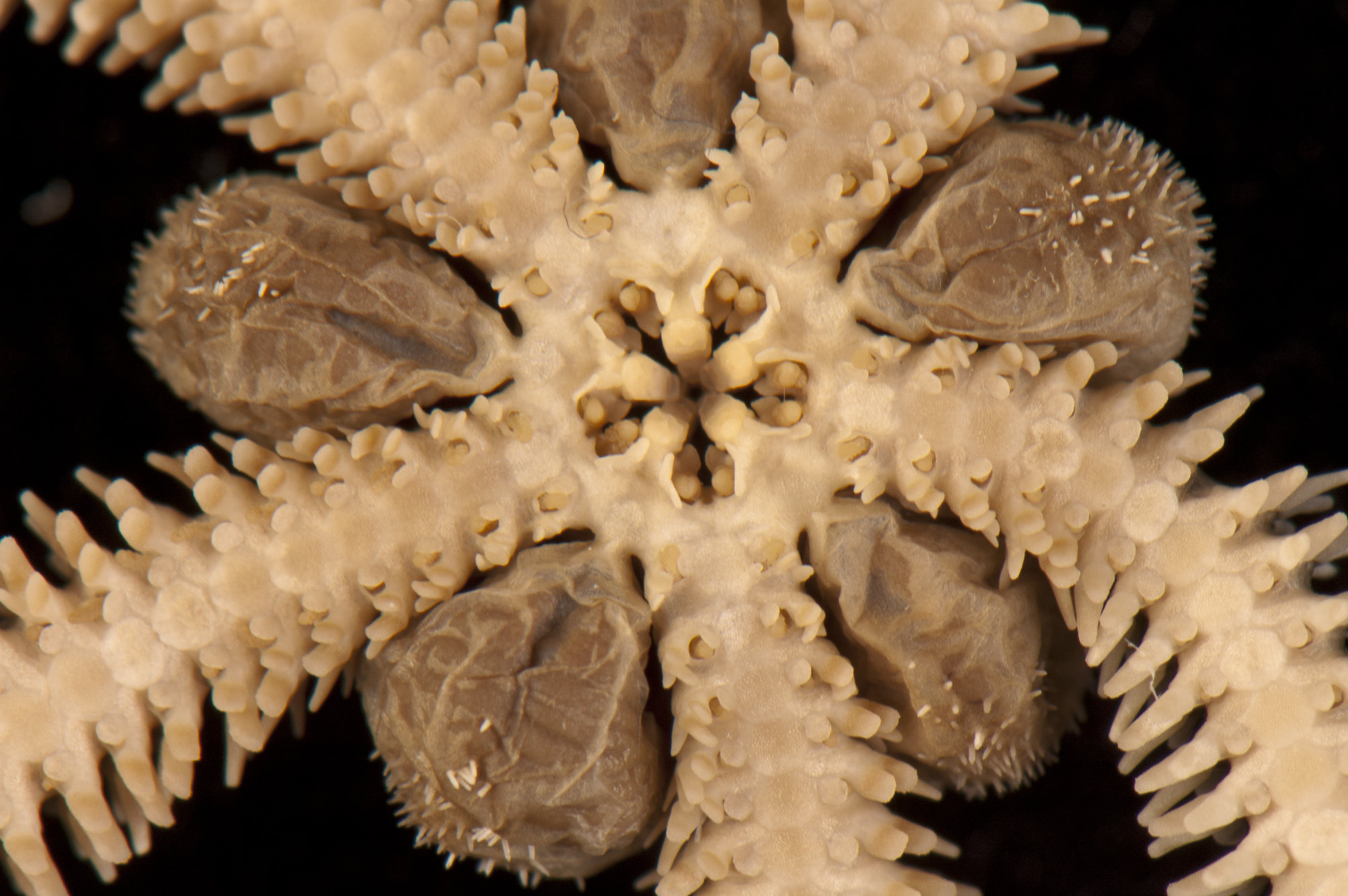
Ophiactis resiliens (oral face)

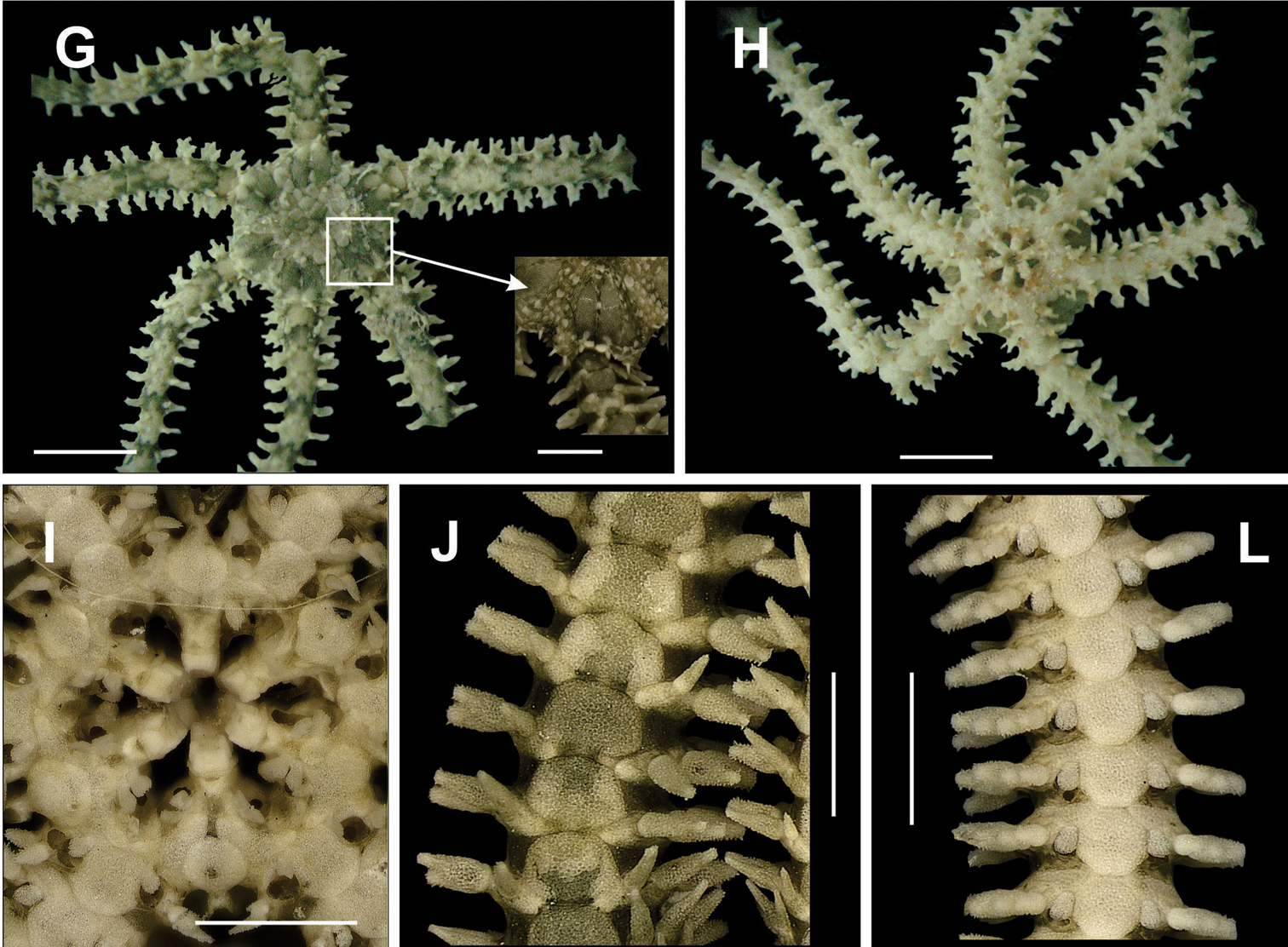
Ophiactis savignyi (details)

The following species are recognised by the World Register of Marine Species :

- Ophiactis abyssicola (M. Sars, 1861)
- Ophiactis affinis Duncan, 1879
- Ophiactis algicola H.L. Clark, 1933
- Ophiactis amator Koehler, 1922
- Ophiactis applegatei Martin-Medrano, Thuy & Garcia-Barrera, 2009 †
- Ophiactis asperula (Philippi, 1858)
- Ophiactis balli (W. Thompson, 1840)
- Ophiactis brachyaspis H.L. Clark, 1911
- Ophiactis brachygenys H.L. Clark, 1911
- Ophiactis brachyura Döderlein, 1898
- Ophiactis brasiliensis Manso, 1988
- Ophiactis brevis H.L. Clark, 1938
- Ophiactis canotia Lyman, 1879
- Ophiactis carnea Ljungman, 1867
- Ophiactis crosnieri Cherbonnier & Guille, 1978
- Ophiactis definita Koehler, 1922
- Ophiactis delagoa J.B. Balinsky, 1957
- Ophiactis dyscrita H.L. Clark, 1911
- Ophiactis flexuosa Lyman, 1879
- Ophiactis fuscolineata H.L. Clark, 1938
- Ophiactis gymnochora H.L. Clark, 1911
- Ophiactis hemiteles H.L. Clark, 1915
- Ophiactis hexacantha H.L. Clark, 1939
- Ophiactis hirta Lyman, 1879
- Ophiactis kroeyeri Lütken, 1856
- Ophiactis lethe A.H. Clark, 1949
- Ophiactis ljungmani Marktanner-Turneretscher, 1887
- Ophiactis loricata Lyman, 1869
- Ophiactis luetkeni Marktanner-Turneretscher, 1887
- Ophiactis luteomaculata H.L. Clark, 1915
- Ophiactis lymani Ljungman, 1872
- Ophiactis macrolepidota Marktanner-Turneretscher, 1887
- Ophiactis modesta Brock, 1888
- Ophiactis muelleri Lütken, 1856
- Ophiactis nama Lyman, 1879
- Ophiactis nidarosiensis Mortensen, 1920
- Ophiactis notabilis H.L. Clark, 1939
- Ophiactis perplexa Koehler, 1897
- Ophiactis picteti (de Loriol, 1893)
- Ophiactis plana Lyman, 1869
- Ophiactis profundi Lütken & Mortensen, 1899
- Ophiactis quadrispina H.L. Clark, 1915
- Ophiactis quinqueradia Ljungman, 1872
- Ophiactis resiliens Lyman, 1879
- Ophiactis rubropoda Singletary, 1973
- Ophiactis savignyi (Müller & Troschel, 1842)
- Ophiactis seminuda Mortensen, 1936
- Ophiactis simplex (LeConte, 1851)
- Ophiactis spinulifera H.L. Clark, 1939
- Ophiactis sulcata Kutscher & Jagt, 2000 †
- Ophiactis tricolor H.L. Clark, 1928
- Ophiactis tyleri Stöhr & Segonzac, 2005
- Ophiactis virens (M. Sars, 1857)
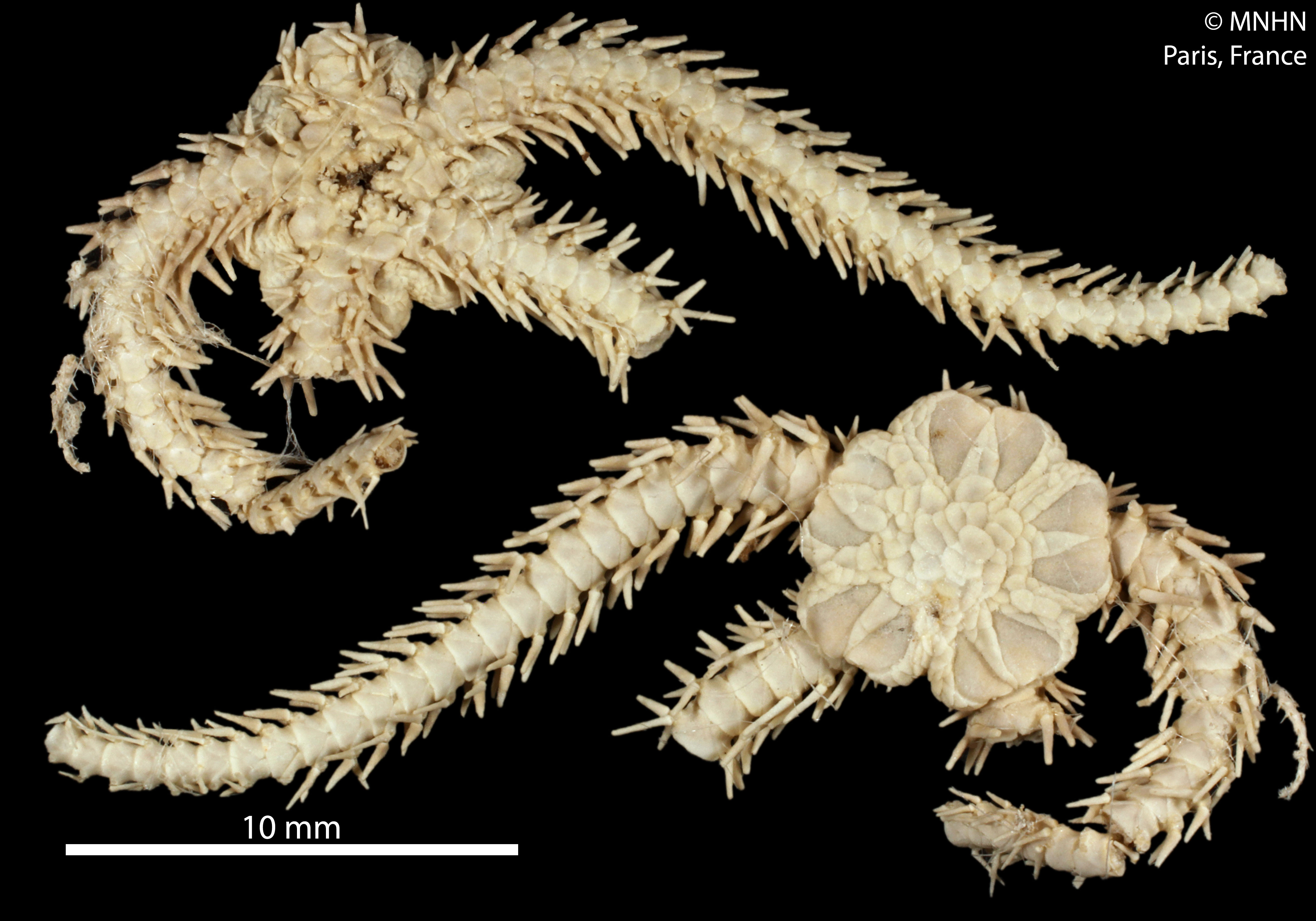
Ophiactis abyssicola

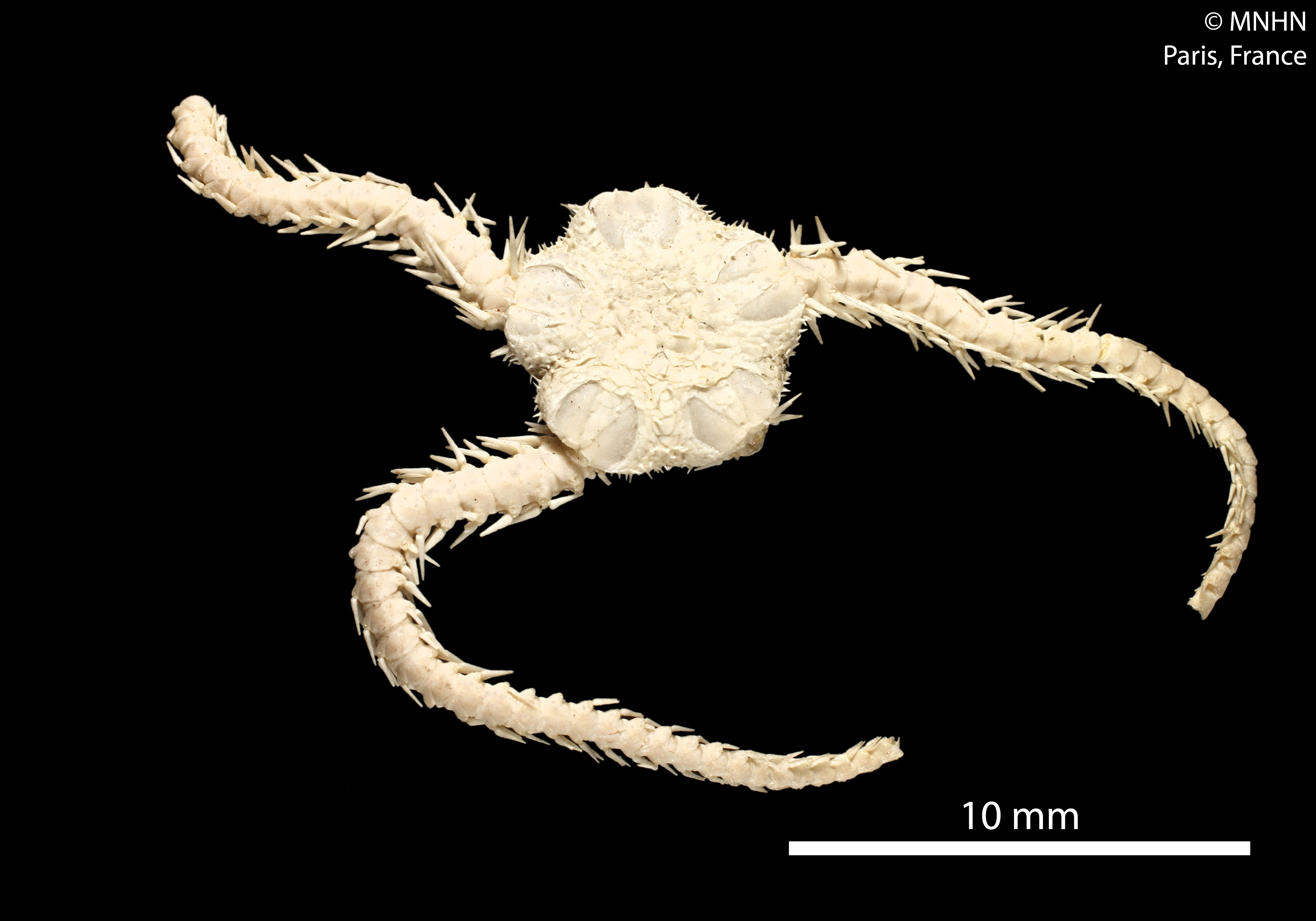
Ophiactis amator

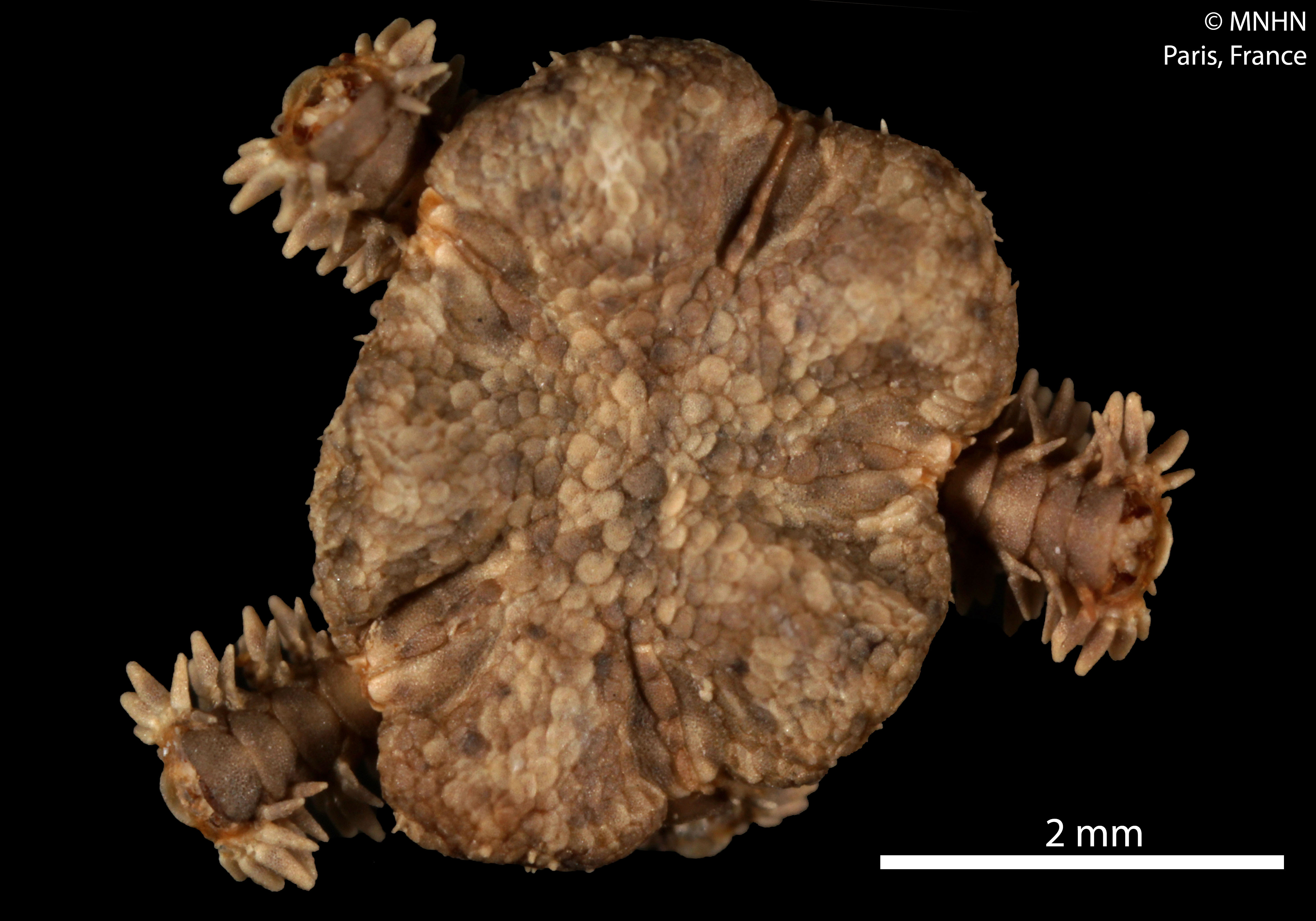
Ophiactis crosnieri

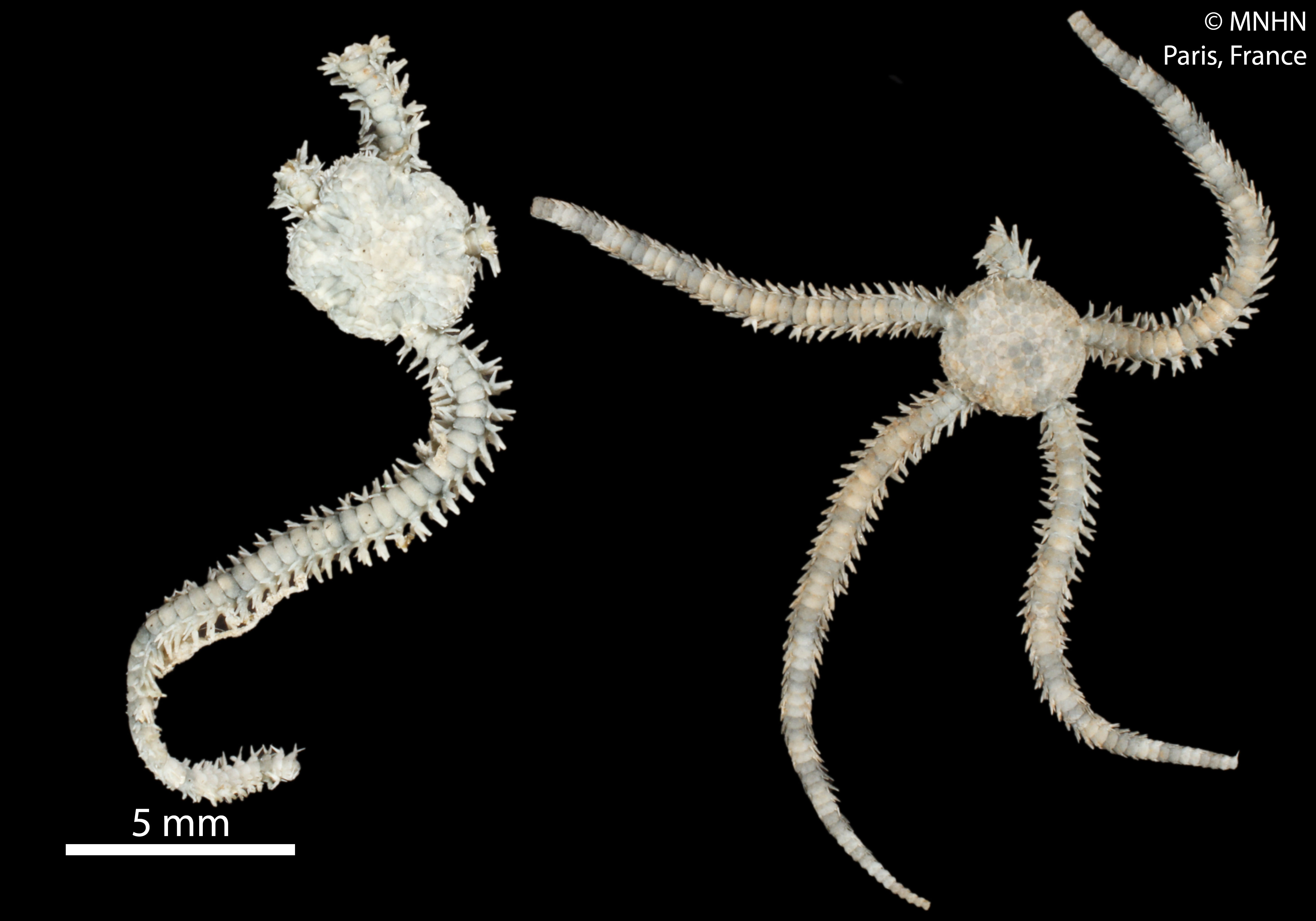
Ophiactis luetkeni

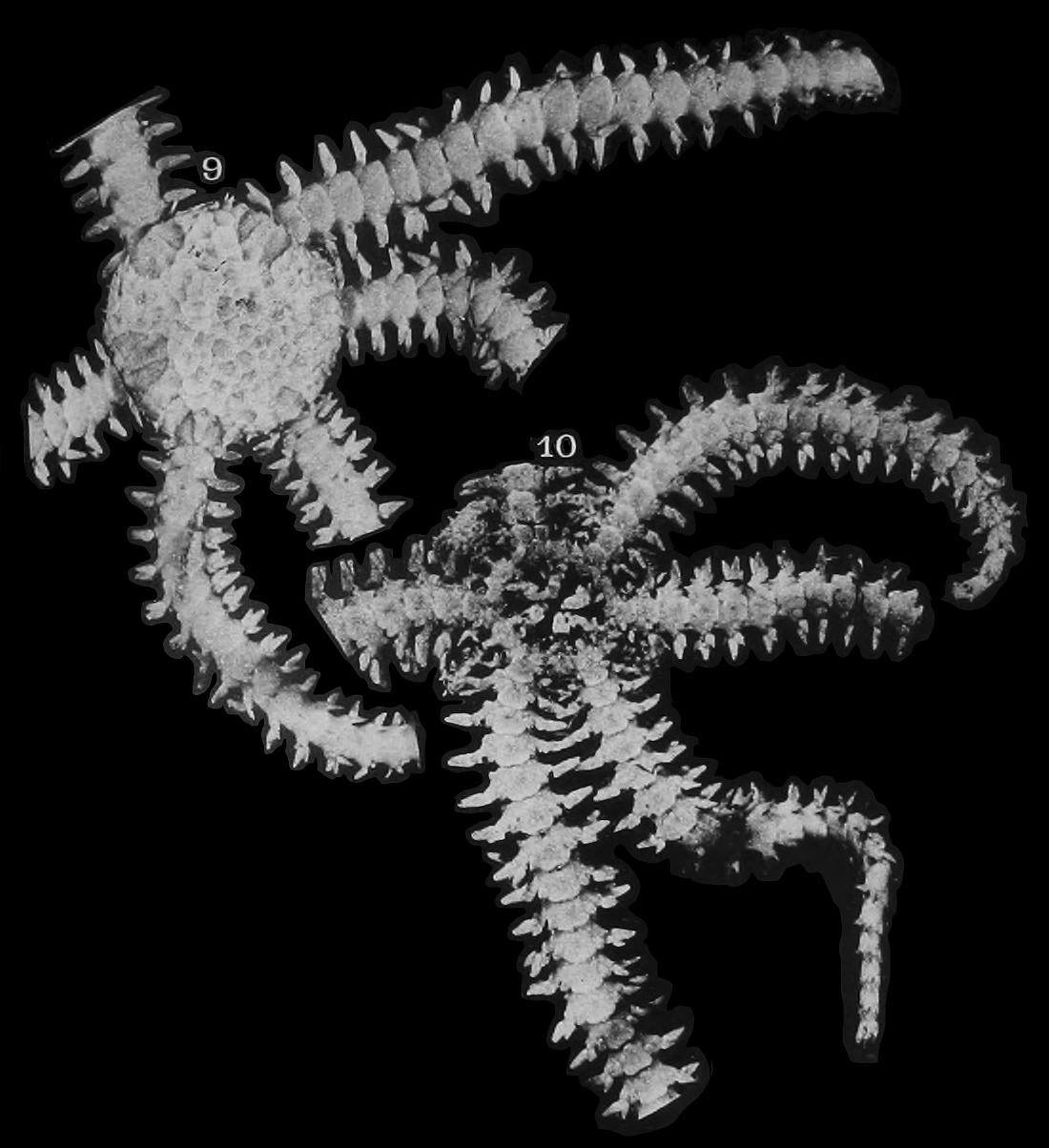
Ophiactis muelleri

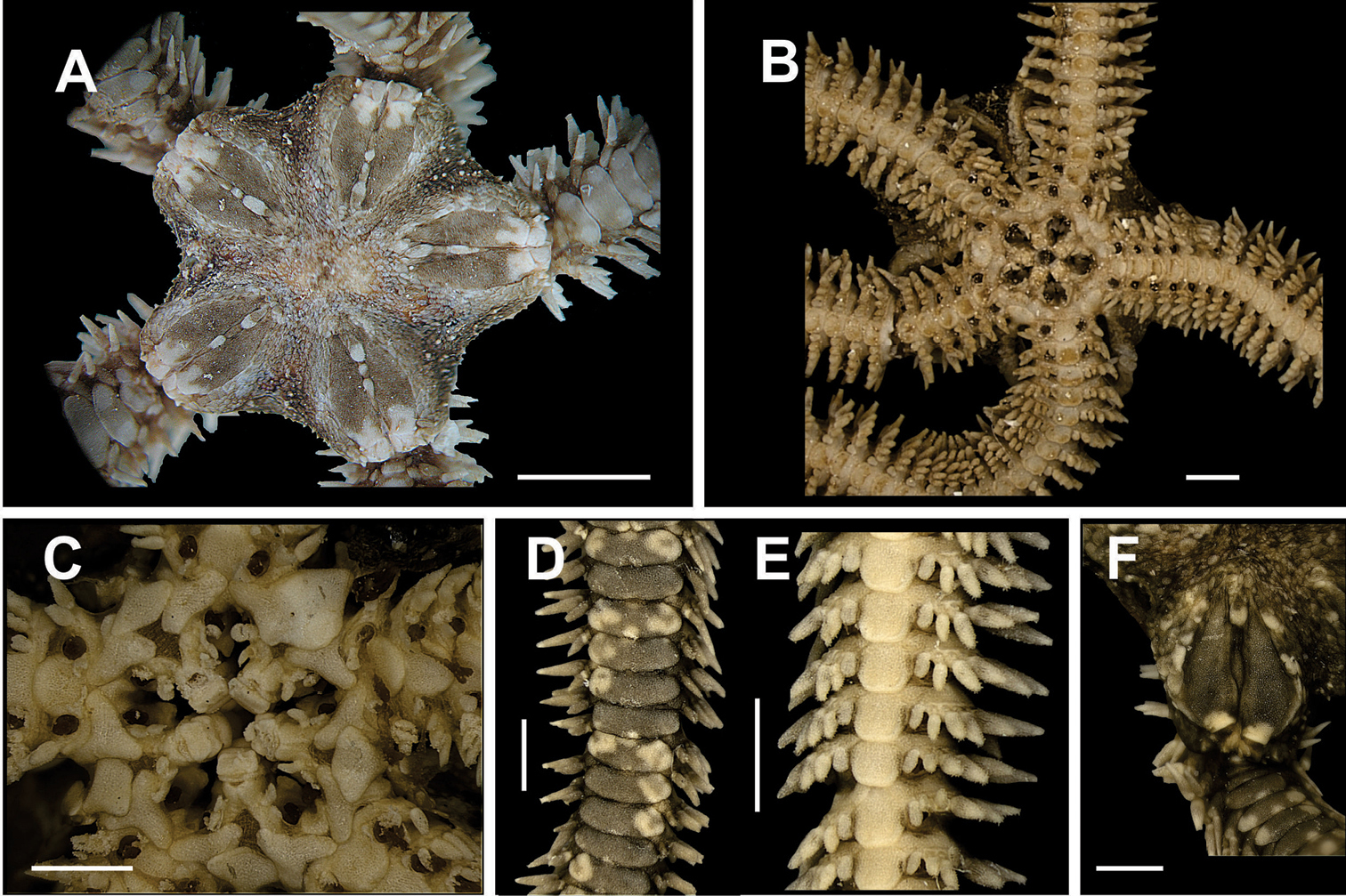
Ophiactis quinqueradia

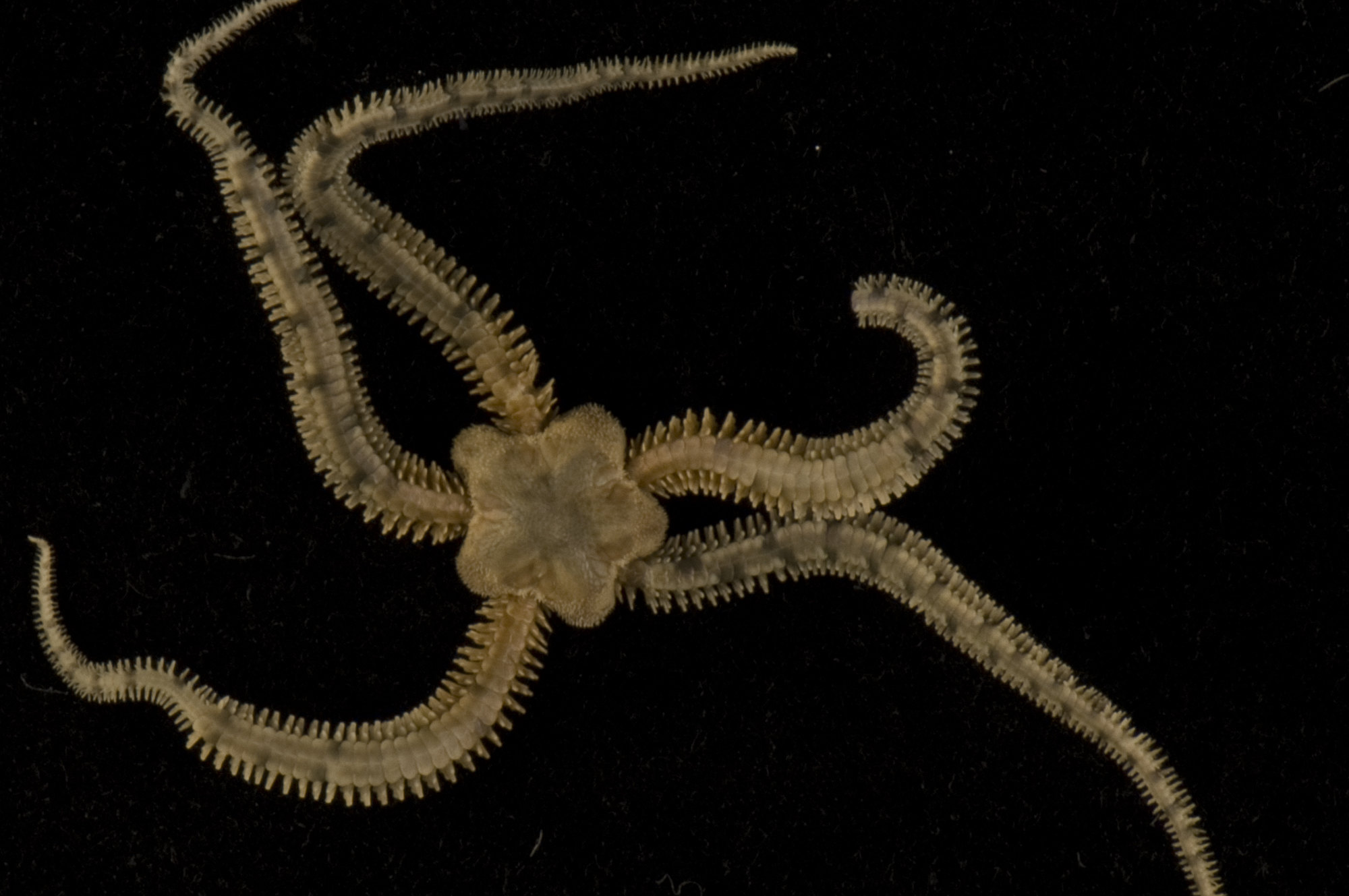
Ophiactis resiliens

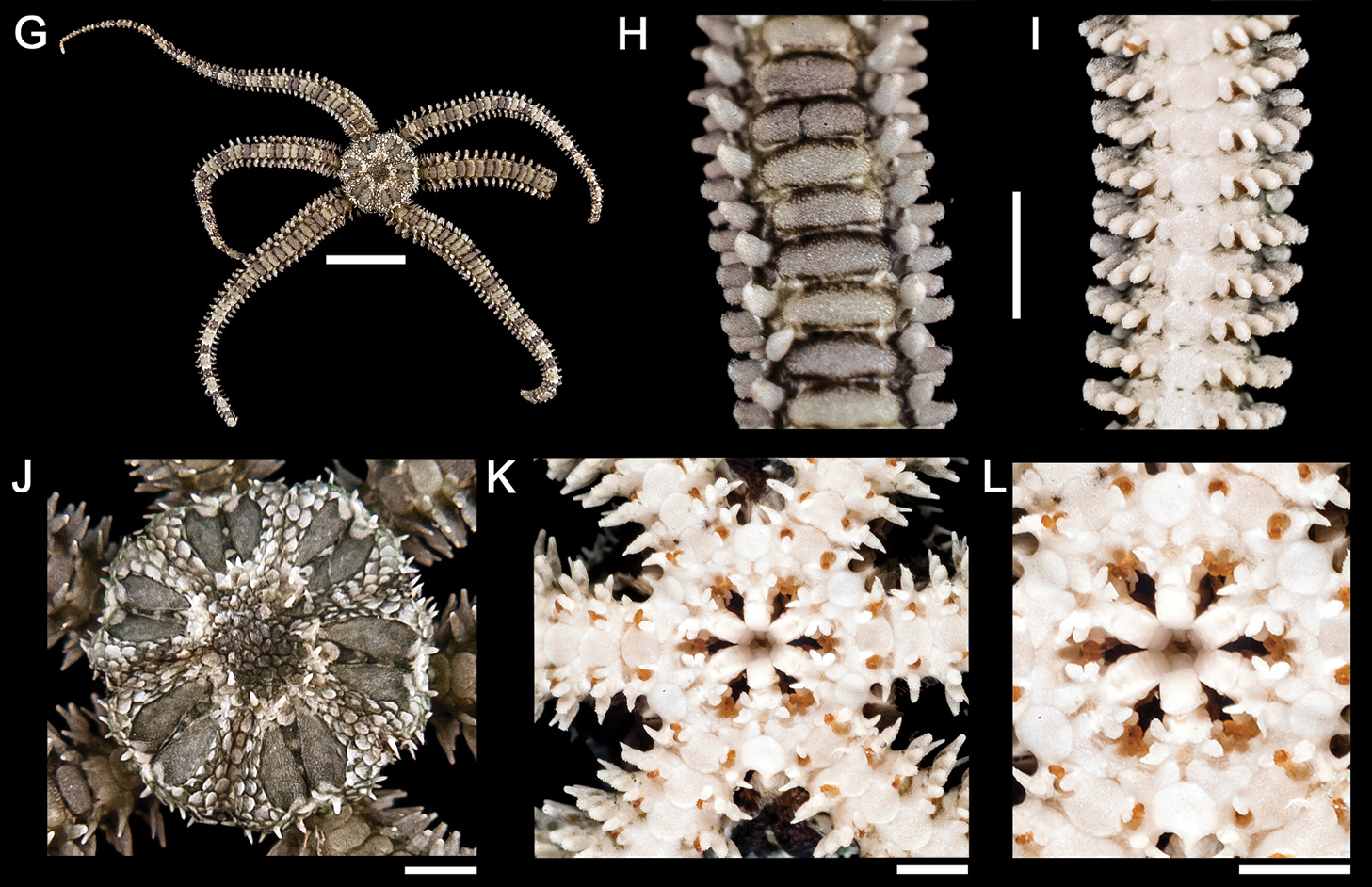
Ophiactis savignyi

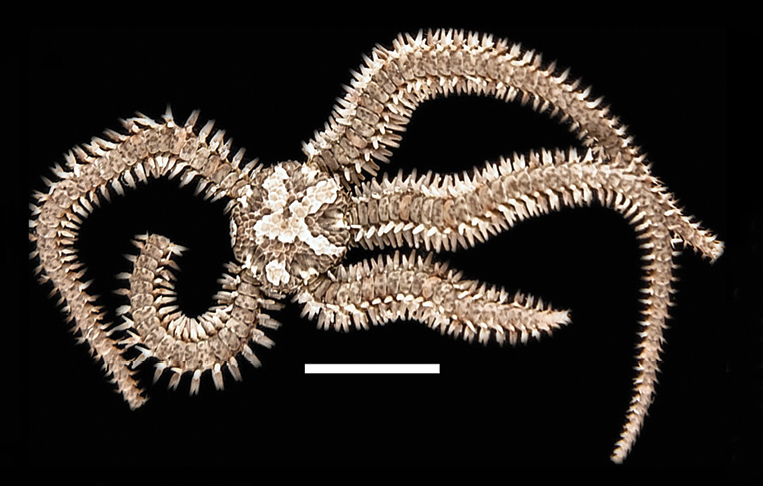
Ophiactis simplex

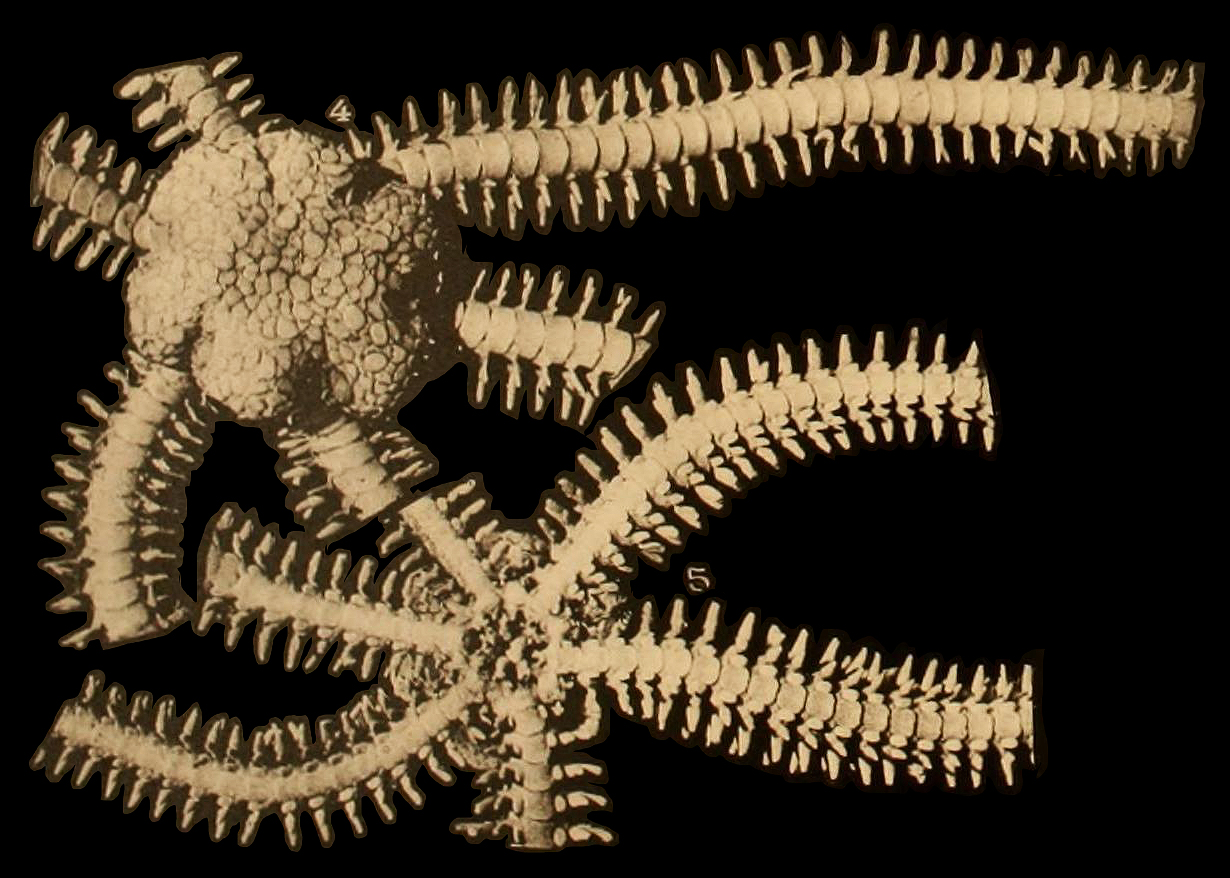
Ophiactis virens
