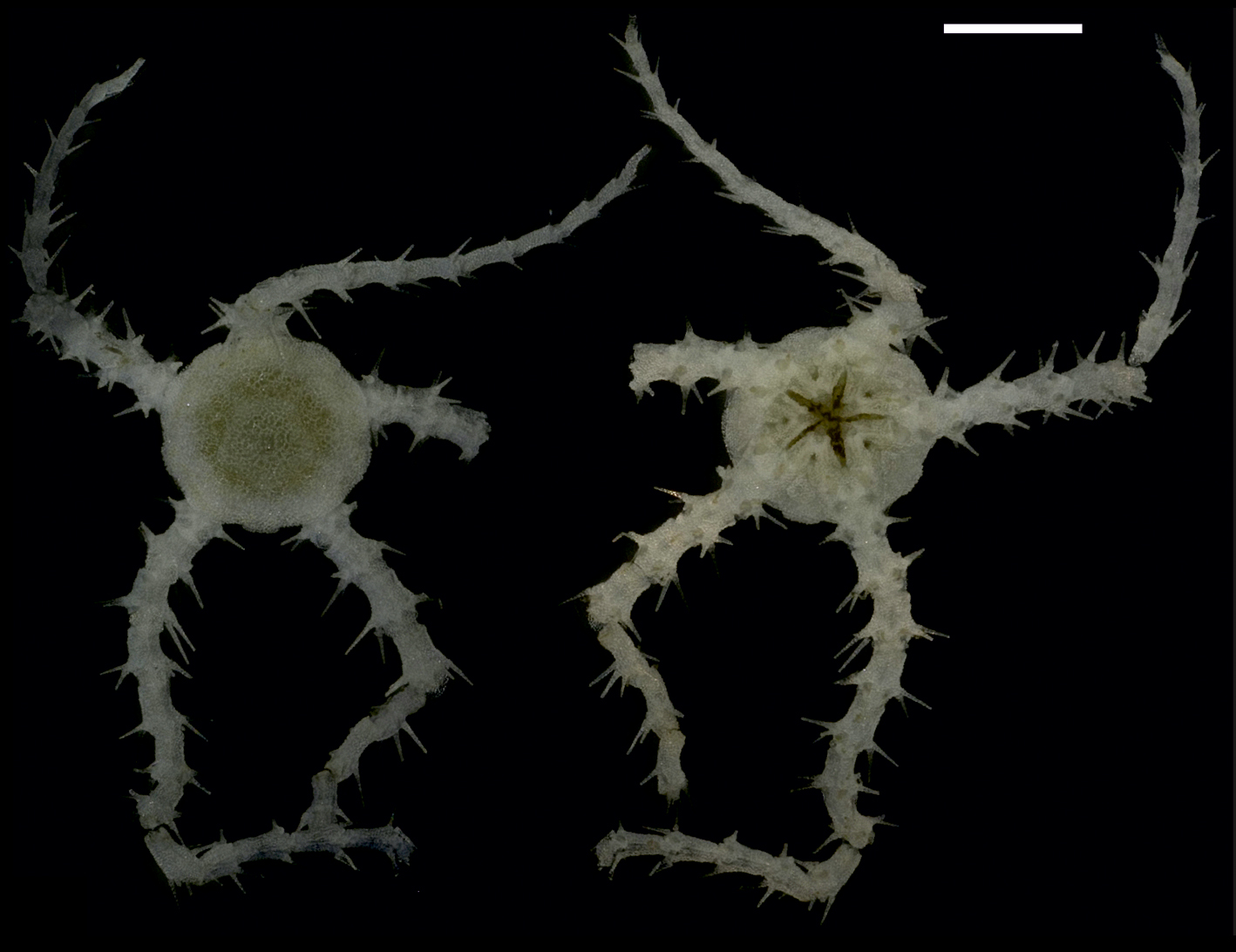

Scientific classification
- Kingdom: Animalia
- Phylum: Echinodermata
- Class: Ophiuroidea
- Order: Amphilepidida
- Family: Amphilepididae
- Genus: Amphilepis; Ljungman, 1867

Species
- See text

= Amphilepis =

Genus of brittle stars

Amphilepis is a genus of brittle stars of the family Amphilepididae. It contains the following species:

- Amphilepis antarctica
- Amphilepis guerini
- Amphilepis ingolfiana
- Amphilepis mobilis
- Amphilepis neozelandica
- Amphilepis norvegica
- Amphilepis nuda
- Amphilepis papyracea
- Amphilepis patens
- Amphilepis pycnostoma
- Amphilepis sanmatiensis
- Amphilepis scutata
- Amphilepis tenuis
- Amphilepis teodorae
