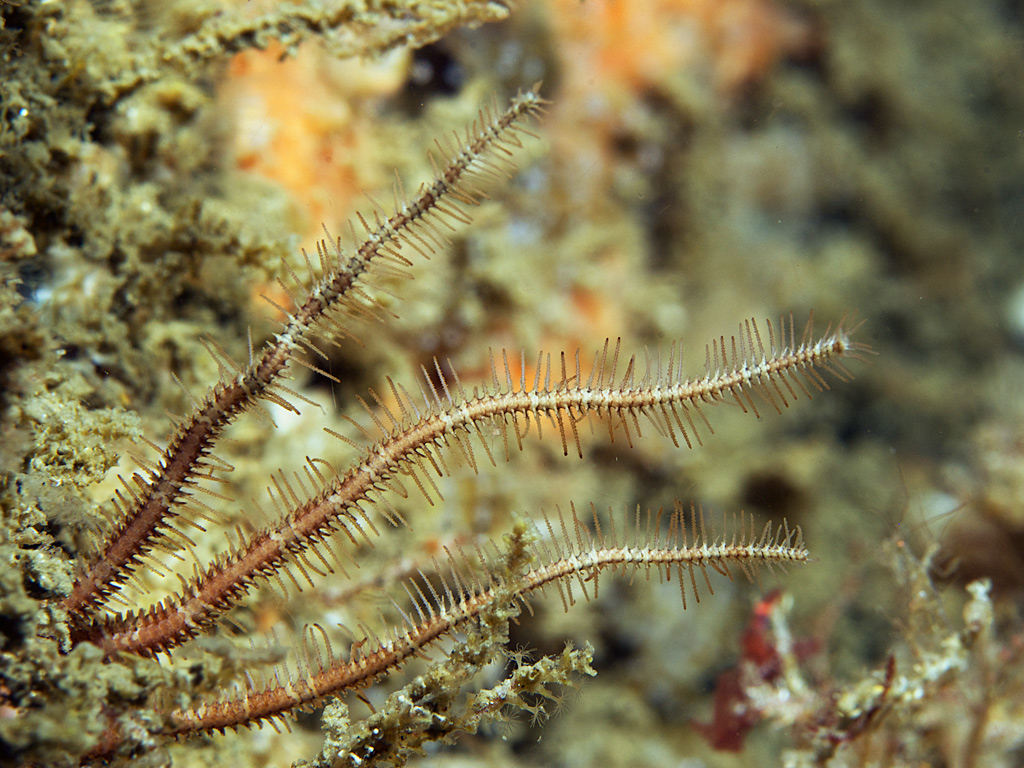
- The brittle star Ophiopsila aranea, Borden Rock, North Cornwall, England, 23m, 13 July 2013.

Scientific classification
- Kingdom: Animalia
- Phylum: Echinodermata
- Class: Ophiuroidea
- Order: Amphilepidida
- Family: Ophiopsilidae
- Genus: Ophiopsila
- Species: O. aranea

Binomial name
- Ophiopsila aranea Forbes, 1843

Synonyms
- Ophianoplus marmoreus M. Sars, 1859

= Ophiopsila aranea =

Species of echinoderm

Ophiopsila aranea is a species of brittle star belonging to the family Ophiocomidae. It is the type species of the genus Ophiopsila

== Original description ==
“I have thought it necessary to constitute a genus for the reception of a naked-bodied, long-armed Ophiura, which is not uncommon in the seas of the Archipelago. It combines some of the characters of Ophiomyxa with some of those of the following genus, and has a habit peculiar to itself. But one species occurs. It has a round disc, sometimes lobed between the rays, flat, coriaceous and smooth. There are two linear nearly parallel separate shields opposite the origin of each ray. The upper ray-scales are square and minutely granulated; the lower ones are quadrangular, with lunate sides. Each lateral ray-plate bears six spathulate spines, the lowest but one of which is longer than the rest, and the lowest smaller. In dead specimens the last laps over the ray-plate, so that its apex meets that of its fellow on the opposite side. The spines can lap close to the rays, except the undermost ones. The longest spines do not quite equal in length the breadth of the ray. The rays are 6½ times as long as the breadth of the disc. The ovarian plates are small and sub-pentagonal. When alive, the colours are brilliant shades of brown, morone [maroon], or orange: when dead, the creature is of a purplish brown. It inhabits various depths above 40 fathoms.”

== Type locality ==
Aegean Sea.

== Etymology ==
aranea = Latin: spider web

== Description ==
A large brittle star with long banded arms which lives in crevices. The arms are banded with light and dark brown and there is a reticulate mottled pattern of brown on the disc. The arm spines are flattened and arranged in groups of 6-8. The tentacle scales are shorter than those of Ophiopsila annulosa but still exceptionally large. Disc 10mm. arms 9x disc diameter.

== Distribution ==
Reported from the Aegean Sea, Eastern Mediterranean, on Atlantic coasts as far north as Great Britain and Ireland. In Great Britain only recorded from the south-west including the Mewstone near Plymouth and North Cornwall. Also known from Galway Bay on the west coast of Ireland.

== Habitat ==
Lives in crevices and extends the long arms out into the water. Found at depths of 20-40m in the sublittoral zone.
