= Histampica haimaensis =

Scientific classification
- Kingdom: Animalia
- Phylum: Echinodermata
- Class: Ophiuroidea
- Order: Ophiurida
- Family: Ophiothamnidae
- Genus: Histampica
- Species: H. haimaensis

Binomial name
- Histampica haimaensis Li, Li, Na, Han, Paterson, Liu, Zhang & Qiu, 2021

Species of brittle star

Histampica haimaensis is a species of brittle star in the family Ophiothamnidae.

== Taxonomy and etymology ==
The species was formally described in 2021 by Qihang Li and colleagues. The type locality, as well as the inspiration for the specific name haimaensis, is the Haima cold seep, located in the South China Sea.

== Description ==
The central disk of the holotype has a diameter of 7 mm, though in other specimens this can range from 4 to 8.2 mm. There are five arms, which are at least five times longer than the disk. All parts of the species are beige, both when alive and when preserved in alcohol.

Naked, marginally overlapping scales cover the top part of the disk, with ten to nine scales (or five to six in smaller specimens) in a line from the middle to the edge. The radial shields (plates arranged in a pair at the base of each arm) do not touch, are shaped either like triangles or semi-circles, and are nearly half as long as the radius of the disk, but are not as wide. The scales of the underside overlap more than the ones on top. Three or four papillae line each side of the jaw. The two papillae furthest from the center are bigger than the other (or others). The oral shields (big plates further from the center of their corresponding jaw) approach a rhombus in shape.

The upper arm plates are shaped like fans, half as long as they are wide, and do not touch. The first arm plate of the underside is small, hexagon-shaped, and touches the second segment. The other arm plates are larger, pentagon-shaped, and do not touch each other. The arm segments at the base have two or three spines, and the rest have four. These spines are almost as long as the arm segments, swell somewhat at the slower half and diminish steadily to a blunt tip.
