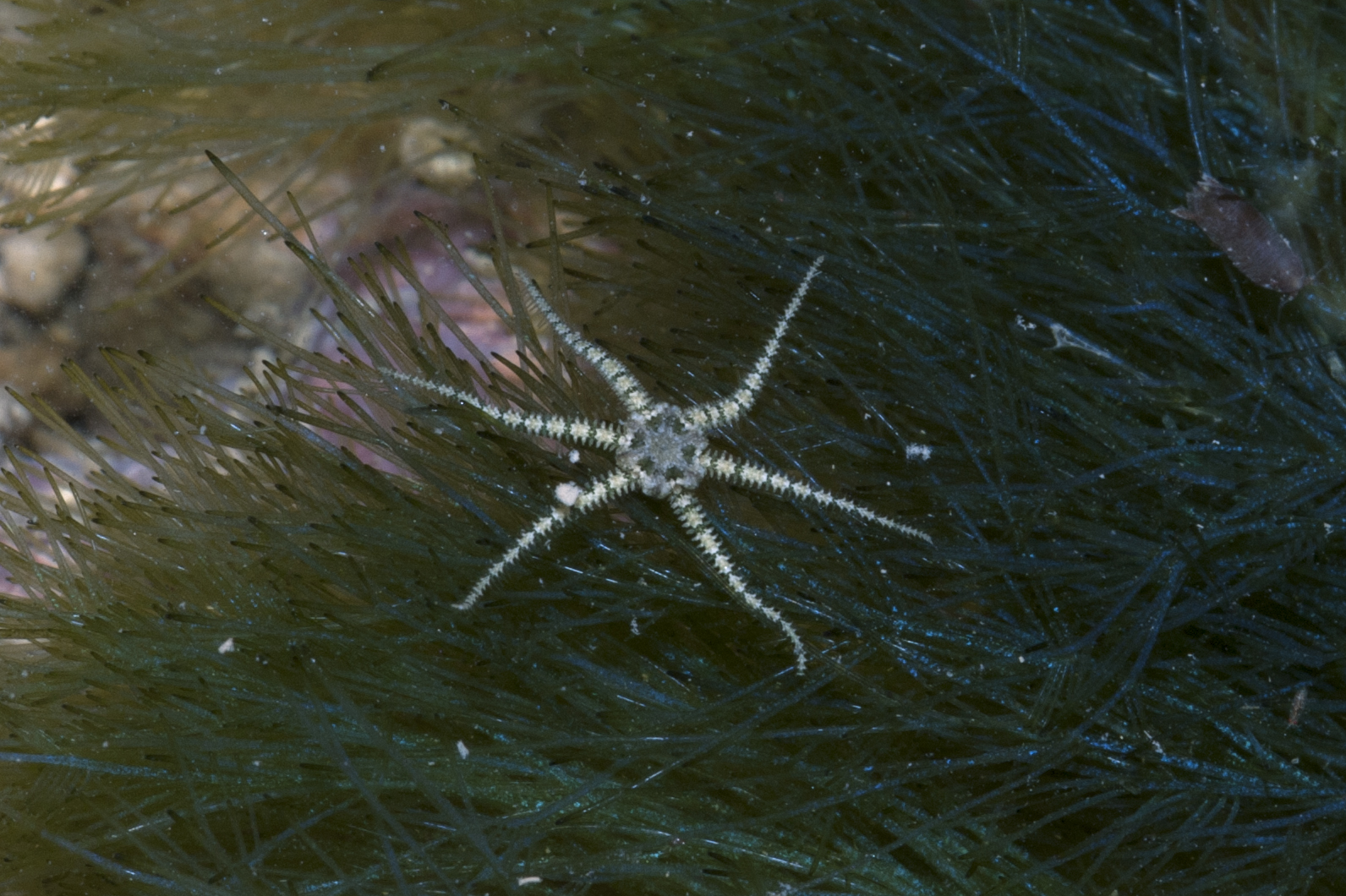

Scientific classification
- Kingdom: Animalia
- Phylum: Echinodermata
- Class: Ophiuroidea
- Order: Amphilepidida
- Family: Ophiactidae
- Genus: Ophiactis
- Species: O. savignyi

Binomial name
- Ophiactis savignyi (Müller & Troschel, 1842)

Synonyms
- List: Ophiactis brocki de Loriol, 1893; Ophiactis conferta Koehler, 1905; Ophiactis incisa von Martens, 1870; Ophiactis krebsii Lütken, 1856; Ophiactis maculosa von Martens, 1870; Ophiactis reinhardti Lütken, 1859; Ophiactis reinhardtii Lütken, 1859; Ophiactis sexradia (Grube, 1857); Ophiactis sixradia Lütken, 1853; Ophiactis versicolor H.L. Clark, 1939; Ophiactis virescens Lütken, 1856; Ophiolepis savignyi Müller & Troschel, 1842; Ophiolepis sexradia Grube, 1857

= Ophiactis savignyi =

Species of brittle star

Ophiactis savignyi is a species of brittle star in the family Ophiactidae, commonly known as Savigny's brittle star or the little brittle star. It occurs in the tropical and subtropical parts of all the world's oceans and is thought to be the brittle star with the most widespread distribution. It was first described by the German zoologists Johannes Peter Müller and Franz Hermann Troschel in 1842. The specific name honours the French zoologist Marie Jules César Savigny.

== Description ==
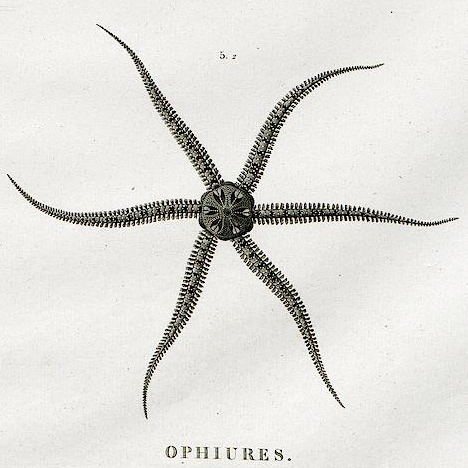
Iconotype drawing by Jules-César Savigny (1809)

The disc of O. savignyi is up to 5 millimetres (0.2 in) in diameter. The aboral (upper) surface is covered by large overlapping scales and bears a scattering of spines, especially round the edges of the disc ; the radial shields are large and dark, and touch each other distally. The (usually) six arms are long, slender and tapering, and are composed of many segments with joints between them. Each segment bears five or six thorny spines. The aboral surface of the disc is a pale greenish-brown colour and the large, triangular radial shields, close to the origins of the arms, are contrastingly darker. The oral (under) surface is cream-coloured.

The following images show various views and parts of O. savignyi under a microscope.

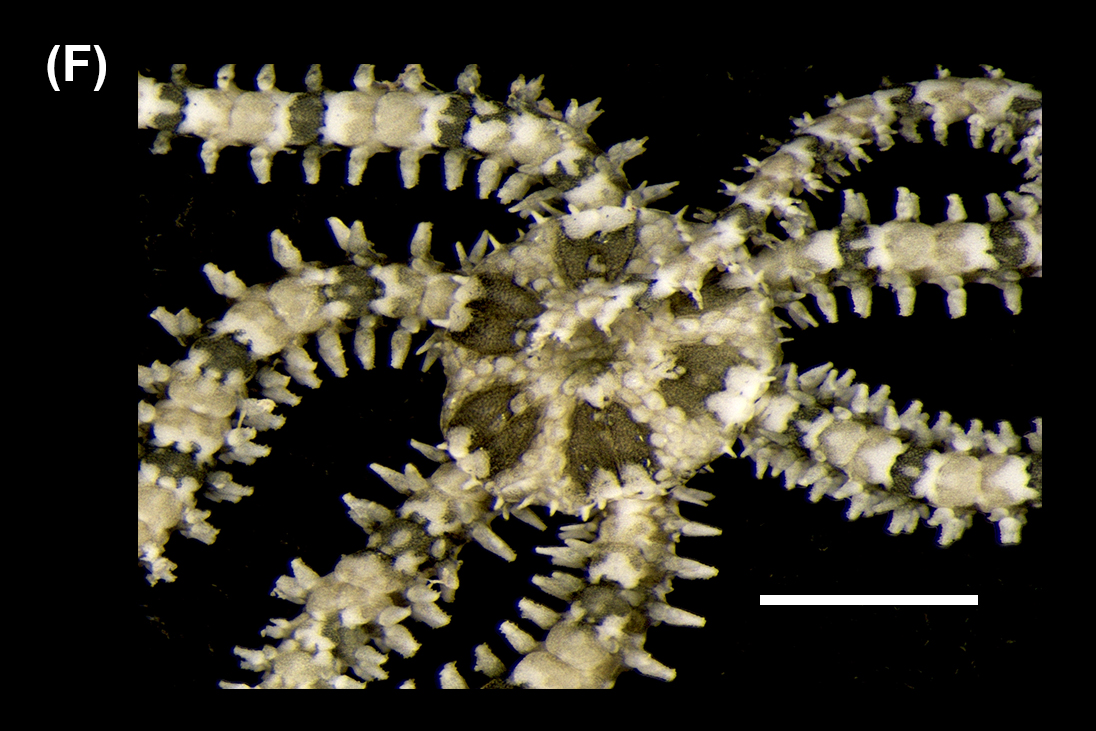

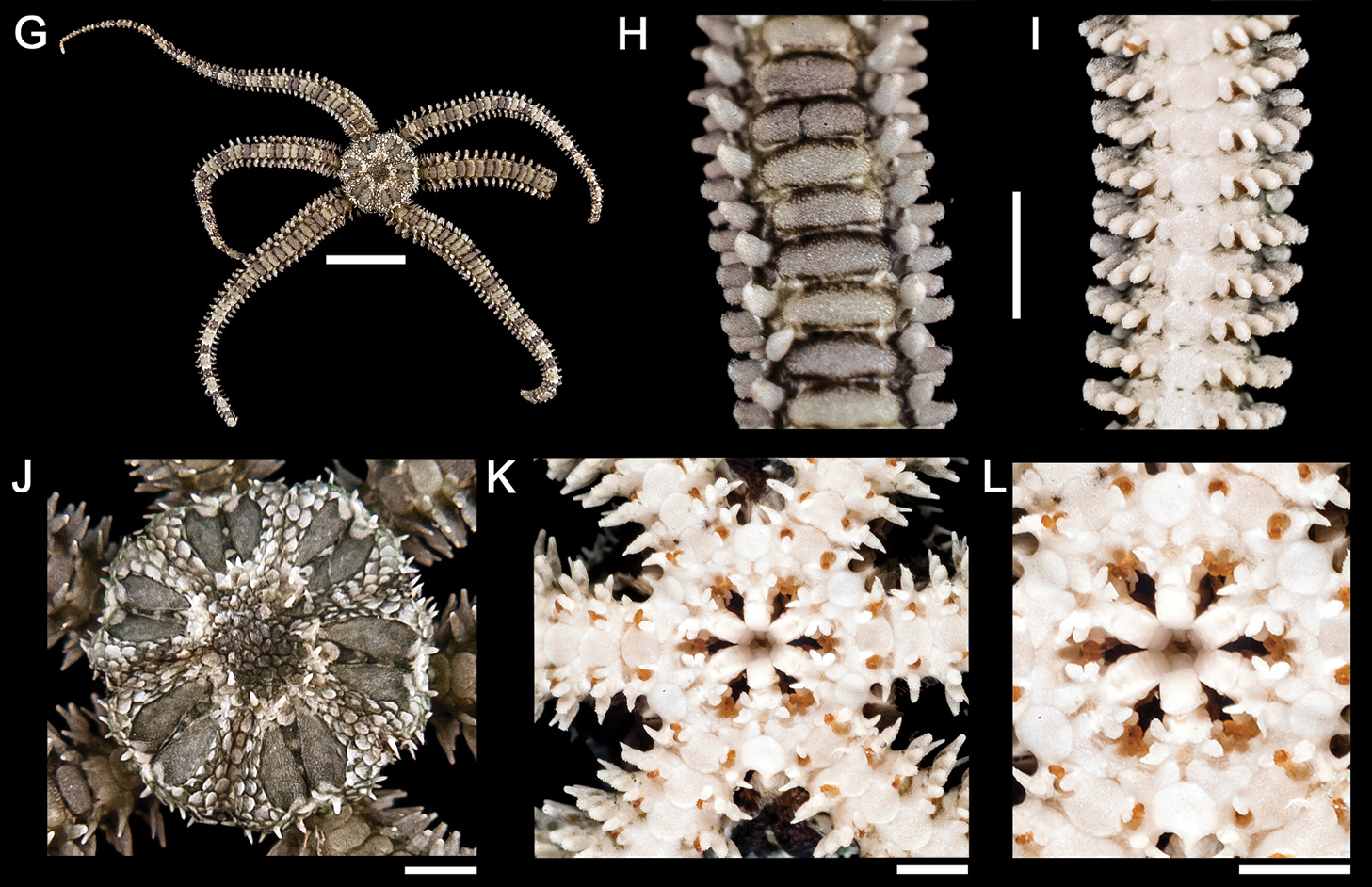

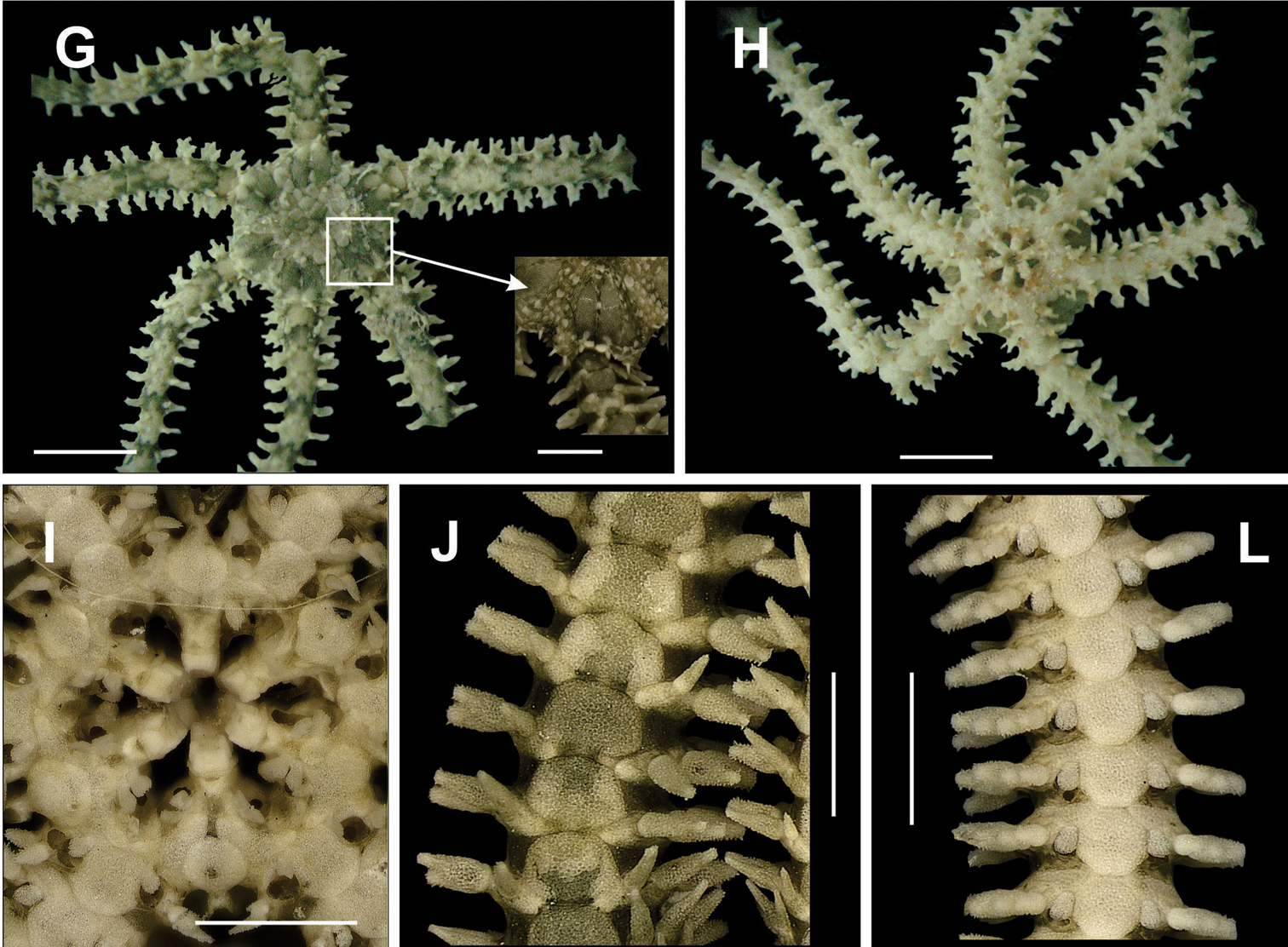

== Distribution and habitat ==
O. savignyi has a near cosmopolitan distribution in warm seas. It is present in the western Indo-Pacific region, the eastern Pacific Ocean, and on both sides of the Atlantic Ocean. The populations in the Pacific and the Atlantic Oceans were only united when the Panama Canal was cut across the Isthmus of Panama in 1914.

This brittle star occurs from the intertidal zone down to about 500 metres (1,640 ft). It is found in all the zones of reefs, in mangrove habitats, in seagrass meadows, among seaweeds and in contaminated waters, and is often found living inside sponges, possibly as a commensal.

== Ecology ==
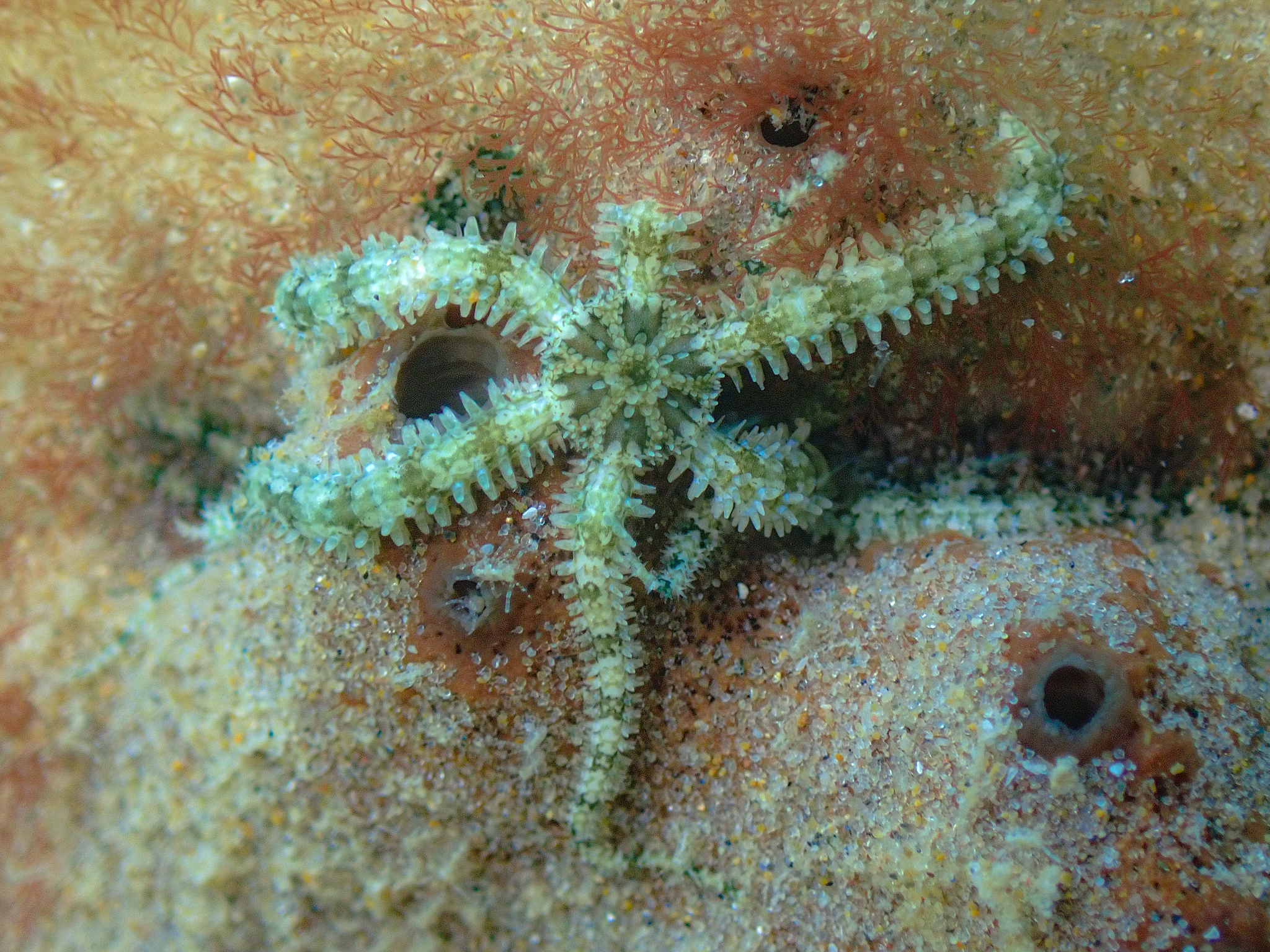
In Mexico

Ophiactis savignyi is a deposit feeder and a scavenger, feeding on the detritus that accumulates on the sea bed. It raises the tips of its arms to detect food particles, rolls any nutritious items into a ball and moves them to the mouth, manipulating them by means of the tube feet. Examination of the stomach contents showed the remains of bryozoans, foraminiferans and gastropod among the large quantities of detritus and grains of sand that this brittle star had ingested.

Individual O. savignyi are either male or female, and they can reproduce either sexually or asexually. Sexual reproduction involves the liberation of sperm and eggs into the sea and the development and eventual settlement of planktonic larvae. Asexual reproduction is by fragmentation, each portion being the same sex as its parent. Small, immature individuals (disc diameter under 4 millimetres (0.16 in)) usually have six arms and can split themselves in two and then regenerate the missing parts of the disc and arms, often ending up with five arms. Most larger individuals have five arms and can also undergo fragmentation. The larger males do so more often than do the females, and this may account for the fact that there is an excess of males in the population. After splitting, the brittle star may still be able to reproduce sexually but some fragments of the disc may have no gonads and thus be unable to spawn until regeneration is complete.

In Taiwan, mature gametes occur at any time from March to December, but most of the population of O. savignyi spawn during May and June. Fission takes place at any time of year but mostly occurs between July and December. Sampling the brittle stars throughout the year resulted in finding that 48% of the individuals inspected were in the process of regeneration. The sex ratio in this locality is twenty-four males for every one female.

In Hawaii, this brittle star is often to be found living in association with a sponge such as Lissodendoryx schmidti (previously Damiriana hawaiiana). Up to twenty individuals can be found clumped together in cavities in the base of the sponge, the area being so filled with the slime secreted by the sponge that the brittle stars can hardly move their arms. These brittle stars often seem to have broken or partly regenerated arms. It is not clear how they enter the sponge, nor how they feed or reproduce.
