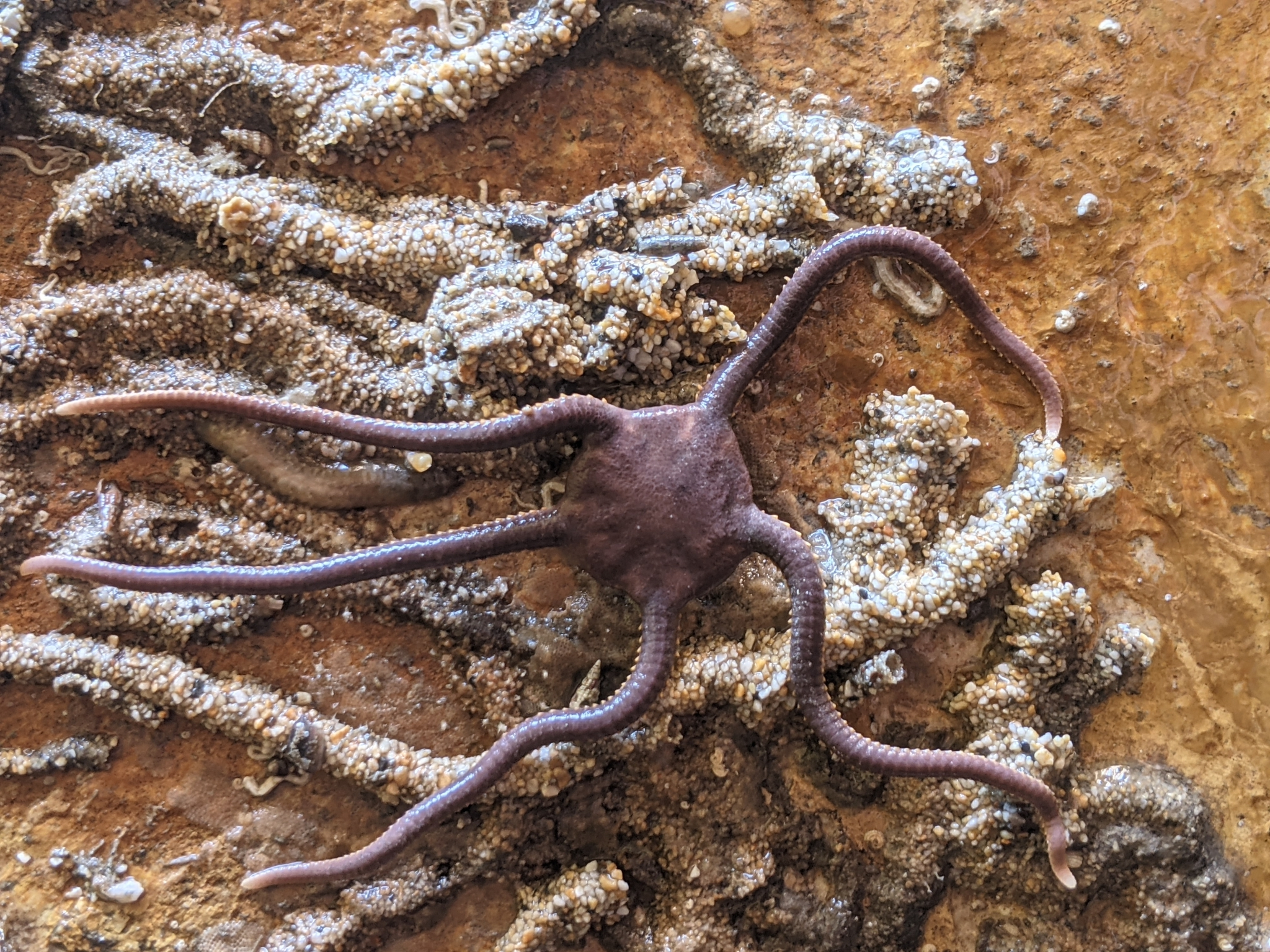
- Ophioplocus esmarki

Scientific classification
- Kingdom: Animalia
- Phylum: Echinodermata
- Class: Ophiuroidea
- Order: Amphilepidida
- Family: Hemieuryalidae
- Genus: Ophioplocus; Lyman, 1861

= Ophioplocus =

Genus of echinoderms

Ophioplocus is a genus of brittle stars in the family Hemieuryalidae. The genus was first described by Thomas Lyman in 1861.

== Species ==
The following 11 species are listed in the World Register of Marine Species (WoRMS):

- Ophioplocus bispinosus H.L. Clark, 1918
- Ophioplocus declinans (Koehler, 1904)
- Ophioplocus esmarki Lyman, 1874
- Ophioplocus giganteus Irimura & Yoshino, 1999
- Ophioplocus hancocki Ziesenhenne, 1935
- Ophioplocus huttoni Farquhar, 1899
- Ophioplocus imbricatus (Müller & Troschel, 1842)
- Ophioplocus incipiens (Koehler, 1922)
- Ophioplocus januarii Lütken, 1856
- Ophioplocus japonicus H.L. Clark, 1911
- Ophioplocus marginatum Fell, 1953
