= Amphicutis =

Scientific classification
- Kingdom: Animalia
- Phylum: Echinodermata
- Class: Ophiuroidea
- Order: Amphilepidida
- Genus: Amphicutis; Pomory, Carpenter & Winter, 2011
- Species: A. stygobita

Binomial name
- Amphicutis stygobita Pomory, Carpenter & Winter, 2011

Genus of brittle stars

Amphicutis is a genus of brittle stars of the family Amphilepididae. It contains a single species, Amphicutis stygobita.
