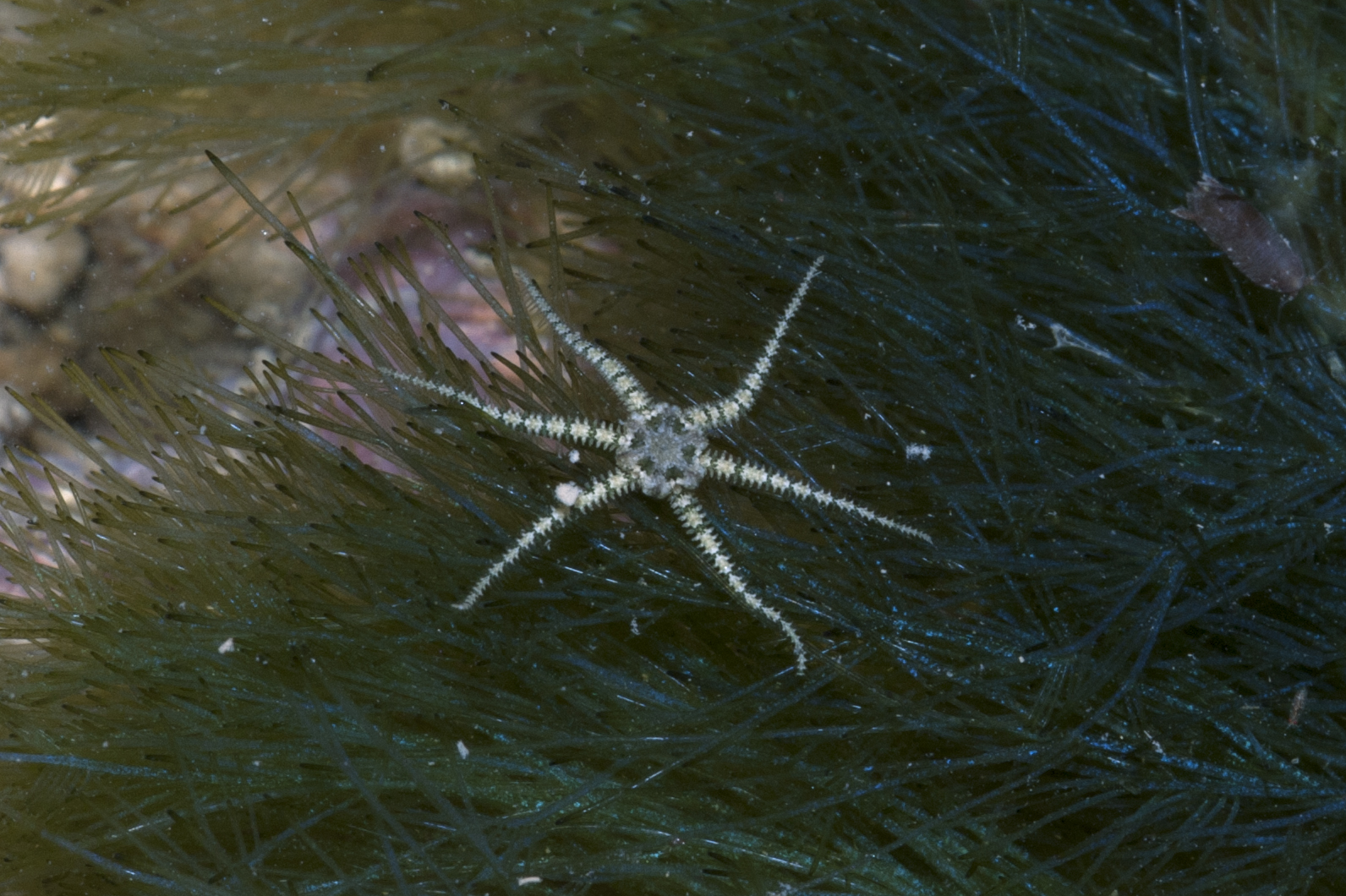
- Ophiactis savignyi

Scientific classification
- Kingdom: Animalia
- Phylum: Echinodermata
- Class: Ophiuroidea
- Order: Amphilepidida
- Suborder: Gnathophiurina
- Superfamily: Ophiactoidea
- Family: Ophiactidae; Matsumoto, 1915

Type genus
- Ophiactis Lütken, 1856

Genera
- Hemipholis Lyman, 1865; Ophiactis Lütken, 1856

= Ophiactidae =

Ophiactidae Temporal range: 110.1–0 Ma Early Cretaceous to Present

Family of brittle stars

Ophiactidae is a family of brittle stars in the superfamily Ophiactoidea. The earliest know fossil from this family (Ophiactis applegatei†) dates back to the Middle Albian in the Early Cretaceous.

== Taxonomy ==
Ophiactidae contains the folloing two genera.

- Hemipholis Lyman, 1865
- Ophiactis Lütken, 1856

The phylogenetic tree per O'Hara et al. (2017) is as follows.

- Gnathophiurina
  - - - Ophiactoidea
        - - - Ophiotrichidae
            - Ophiopholidae
          - - Ophiactidae
        - - Ophiothamnidae
  - Amphiuroidea
    - Amphiuridae
    - Amphilepididae
