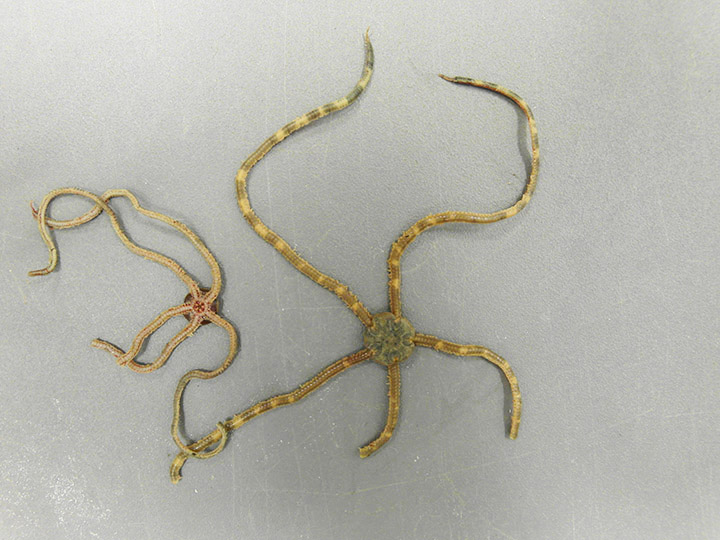
- Hemipholis elongata

Scientific classification
- Kingdom: Animalia
- Phylum: Echinodermata
- Class: Ophiuroidea
- Order: Amphilepidida
- Family: Ophiactidae
- Genus: Hemipholis; Lyman, 1865

Species
- See text

= Hemipholis =

Genus of brittle stars

Hemipholis is a genus of brittle stars.

== Species ==
- Hemipholis affinis (Ljungman, 1867)
- Hemipholis cordifera (Bosc, 1802)
- Hemipholis elongata (Say, 1825)
- Hemipholis gracilis (Verrill, 1867)
- Hemipholis microdiscus (Duncan, 1879)
- Hemipholis wallichii (Duncan, 1881)
