= Ophiothamnus =

Scientific classification
- Kingdom: Animalia
- Phylum: Echinodermata
- Class: Ophiuroidea
- Order: Amphilepidida
- Family: Ophiothamnidae
- Genus: Ophiothamnus; Lyman, 1869

Type species
- Ophiothamnus vicarius Lyman, 1869

Synonyms
- Ophioleda Koehler, 1906

Genus of brittle stars

Ophiothamnus is a genus of brittle stars described by Theodore Lyman III in 1869. It contains ten species, with Ophiothamnus vicarius as the type species.

== Species ==
Ophiothamnus contains the following species:

- Ophiothamnus affinis Ljungman, 1872
- Ophiothamnus biocal O'Hara & Stöhr, 2006
- Ophiothamnus chariis H.L. Clark, 1915
- Ophiothamnus dupla Tommasi, 1976
- Ophiothamnus habrotatus (H.L. Clark, 1911)
- Ophiothamnus longibrachius H.L. Clark, 1939
- Ophiothamnus otho A.H. Clark, 1949
- Ophiothamnus remotus Lyman, 1878
- Ophiothamnus venustus Matsumoto, 1915
- Ophiothamnus vicarius Lyman, 1869
