= Ophiopholis aculeata =

Scientific classification
- Kingdom: Animalia
- Phylum: Echinodermata
- Class: Ophiuroidea
- Order: Amphilepidida
- Family: Ophiopholidae
- Genus: Ophiopholis
- Species: O. aculeata

Binomial name
- Ophiopholis aculeata (Linnaeus, 1767)

Synonyms
- Asterias aculeata Linnaeus, 1767; Ophiocoma bellis (Fleming, 1828); Ophiolepis scolopendrica Müller & Troschel, 1842; Ophiopholis bellis (Forbes, 1839); Ophiura bellis Fleming, 1828; Ophiura bellis Johnston, 1935; Polypholis echinata Duncan, 1880

Species of brittle star

Ophiopholis aculeata, the crevice brittle star or daisy brittle star, is a species of brittle star in the family Ophiopholidae. It has a circum-polar distribution and is found in the Arctic Ocean, the northern Atlantic Ocean and the northern Pacific.

== Description ==
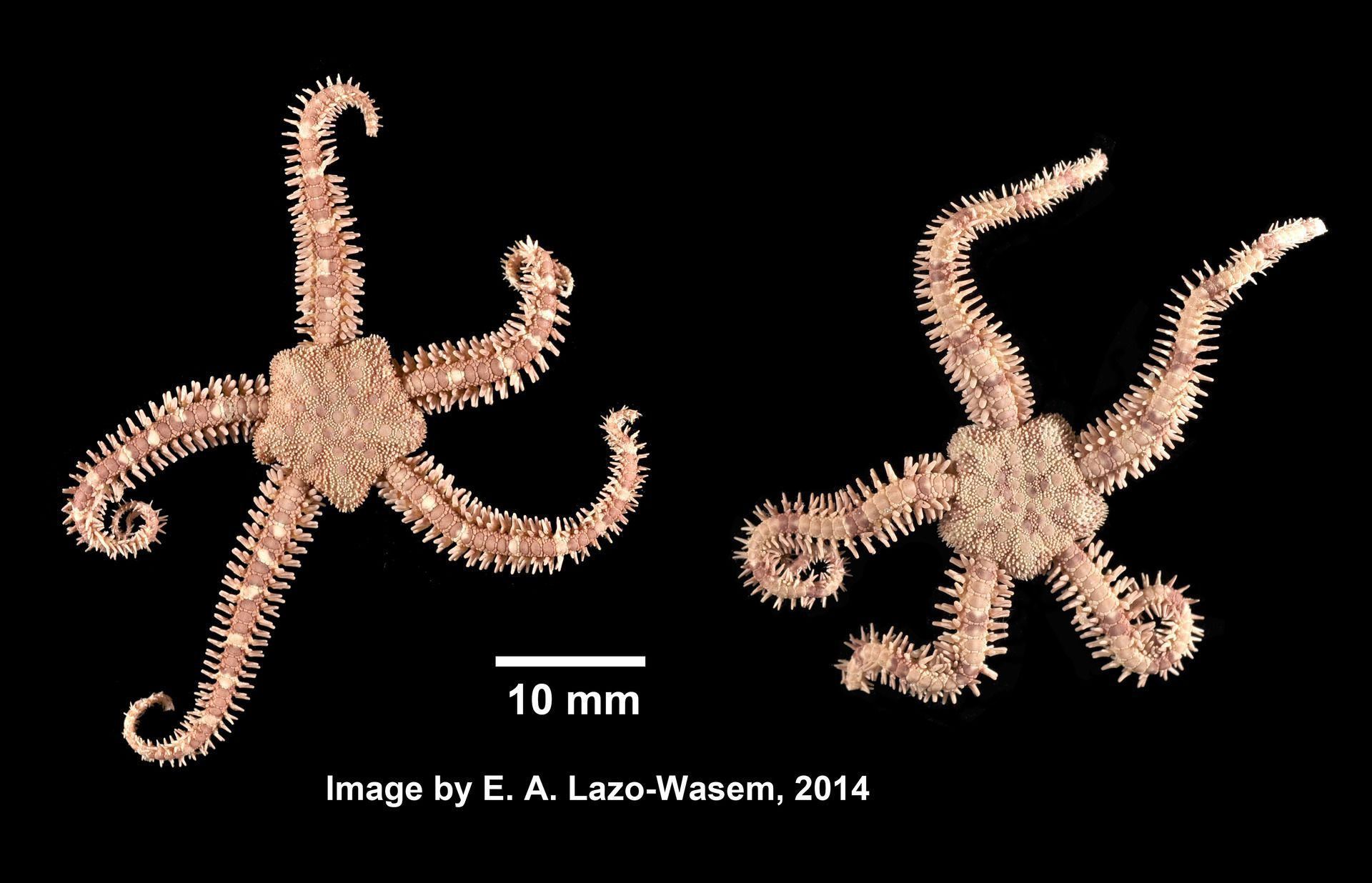
Oral and aboral views of O. aculeata

Ophiopholis aculeata has a central pentagonal disc up to 2 cm (0.8 in) in diameter; this is clearly set off from the five robust, twisted arms, which are four times as long as the disc is wide. The mouth is on the oral or underside of the disc and is surrounded by five toothed jaws. The aboral or upper side of the disc is granular, and a pair of large scales, the radial shield, covers the base of each arm. The radial shield is covered with small spines which conceal the scales. The many-jointed arms are covered with more scales both on the oral and aboral surfaces; on the aboral surface there is a regular series of oval scales each surrounded by smaller scales. There are six or seven stout spines per segment, with one short spine being hooked. The colour varies, being often reddish or variegated, and sometimes purplish; the central scales on the disc often form a ten-pointed star and there are often darker bands on the arms.

== Distribution and habitat ==
This brittle star has a circum-boreal distribution. In the northern Atlantic Ocean it is common around Iceland, Spitzbergen and Norway southwards to the North Sea. On the eastern coast of North America its range extends from Greenland southwards to Long Island, and in the Pacific Ocean, its range stretches from Japan and the Bering Sea southwards to California. It is generally found on rocky substrates where it has a tendency to hide inside shells, in hollows and crevices. It generally occurs at depths less than 300 m (1,000 ft) but has been found as deep as 1,880 m (6,200 ft).

== Biology ==
O. aculeata with two partly regenrated arms

Ophiopholis aculeata feeds on detritus and small organisms that it traps with its tube feet and with mucus secreted by glands on its arms. It is preyed on by fish and birds.

The sexes are separate in this species, and fertilisation is external. Mass spawning events have been seen, with all the individuals of this species in a locality releasing their spawn at the same time in response to some environmental cue. This has been observed in Jamaica at night, during the period 20:00 hours to 22:00 hours, and in both morning and afternoon in the Gulf of Saint Lawrence, Canada. The cue that triggers a spawning event may be a change in the temperature of the water. Spawning tends to occur at 6.5 to 7 °C (43.7 to 44.6 °F) in Alaska, and about a degree cooler than this further north in the White Sea. Several spawning events have occurred when warmer surface waters have down-welled into deep, colder water layers. The larvae of brittle stars are known as ophiopluteus larvae and form part of the plankton. When they are fully developed, they settle on the seabed and undergo metamorphosis into juvenile brittle stars.
