= Ophiothamnidae =

- Dried preserved specimen of Ophiothamnus affinis (oral view)

Scientific classification
- Kingdom: Animalia
- Phylum: Echinodermata
- Class: Ophiuroidea
- Order: Amphilepidida
- Superfamily: Ophiactoidea
- Family: Ophiothamnidae; O'Hara, Stöhr, Hugall, Thuy & Martynov, 2018

Type genus
- Ophiothamnus Lyman, 1869

Genera
- 3, see text

Family of brittle stars

Ophiothamnidae is a family of brittle stars in the superfamily Ophiactoidea. It contains three genera, with Ophiothamnus as the type genus.

== Taxonomy ==
Ophiothamnidae contains the folloing three genera.

- Histampica A.M. Clark, 1970
- Ophioleila A.H. Clark, 1949
- Ophiothamnus Lyman, 1869

The phylogenetic tree per O'Hara et al. (2017) is as follows.

- Gnathophiurina
  - - - Ophiactoidea
        - - - Ophiotrichidae
            - Ophiopholidae
          - - Ophiactidae
        - - Ophiothamnidae
  - Amphiuroidea
    - Amphiuridae
    - Amphilepididae
