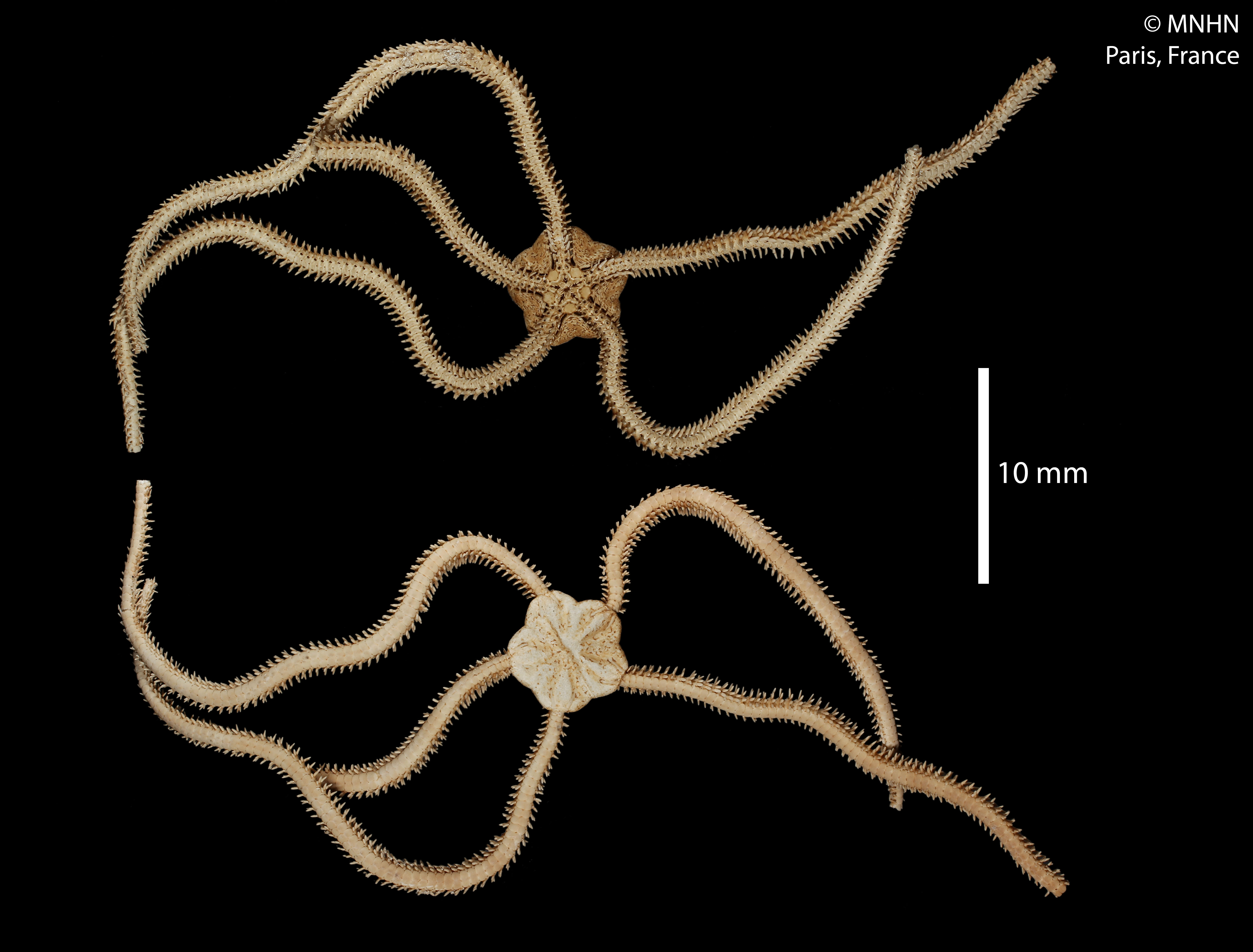
- Dried preserved specimen of Ophiopsila paucispina (oral and aboral view)

Scientific classification
- Kingdom: Animalia
- Phylum: Echinodermata
- Class: Ophiuroidea
- Order: Amphilepidida
- Family: Ophiopsilidae
- Genus: Ophiopsila; Forbes, 1843

= Ophiopsila =

Genus of brittle stars

Ophiopsila is a genus of brittle star belonging to the monogeneric family Ophiopsilidae. Many species are bioluminescent.

== List of species ==
- Ophiopsila abscissa Liao, 1982
- Ophiopsila annulosa (M. Sars, 1859)
- Ophiopsila aranea Forbes, 1843
- Ophiopsila bispinosa A.M. Clark, 1974
- Ophiopsila brevisquama Koehler, 1930
- Ophiopsila californica A.H. Clark, 1921
- Ophiopsila caribea (Ljungman, 1872)
- Ophiopsila dilatata Koehler, 1930
- Ophiopsila fulva Lyman, 1878
- Ophiopsila glabra Koehler, 1930
- Ophiopsila guineensis Koehler, 1914
- Ophiopsila hartmeyeri Koehler, 1913
- Ophiopsila maculata (Verrill, 1899)
- Ophiopsila multipapillata Guille & Jangoux, 1978
- Ophiopsila multispina Koehler, 1930
- Ophiopsila novaezealandiae Baker, 1974
- Ophiopsila pantherina Koehler, 1898
- Ophiopsila paucispina Koehler, 1907
- Ophiopsila picturata Koehler, 1930
- Ophiopsila platispina Koehler, 1914
- Ophiopsila polyacantha H.L. Clark, 1915
- Ophiopsila polysticta H.L. Clark, 1915
- Ophiopsila riisei Lütken, 1859
- Ophiopsila seminuda A.M. Clark, 1952
- Ophiopsila squamifera Murakami, 1963
- Ophiopsila timida Koehler, 1930
- Ophiopsila vittata H.L. Clark, 1918
