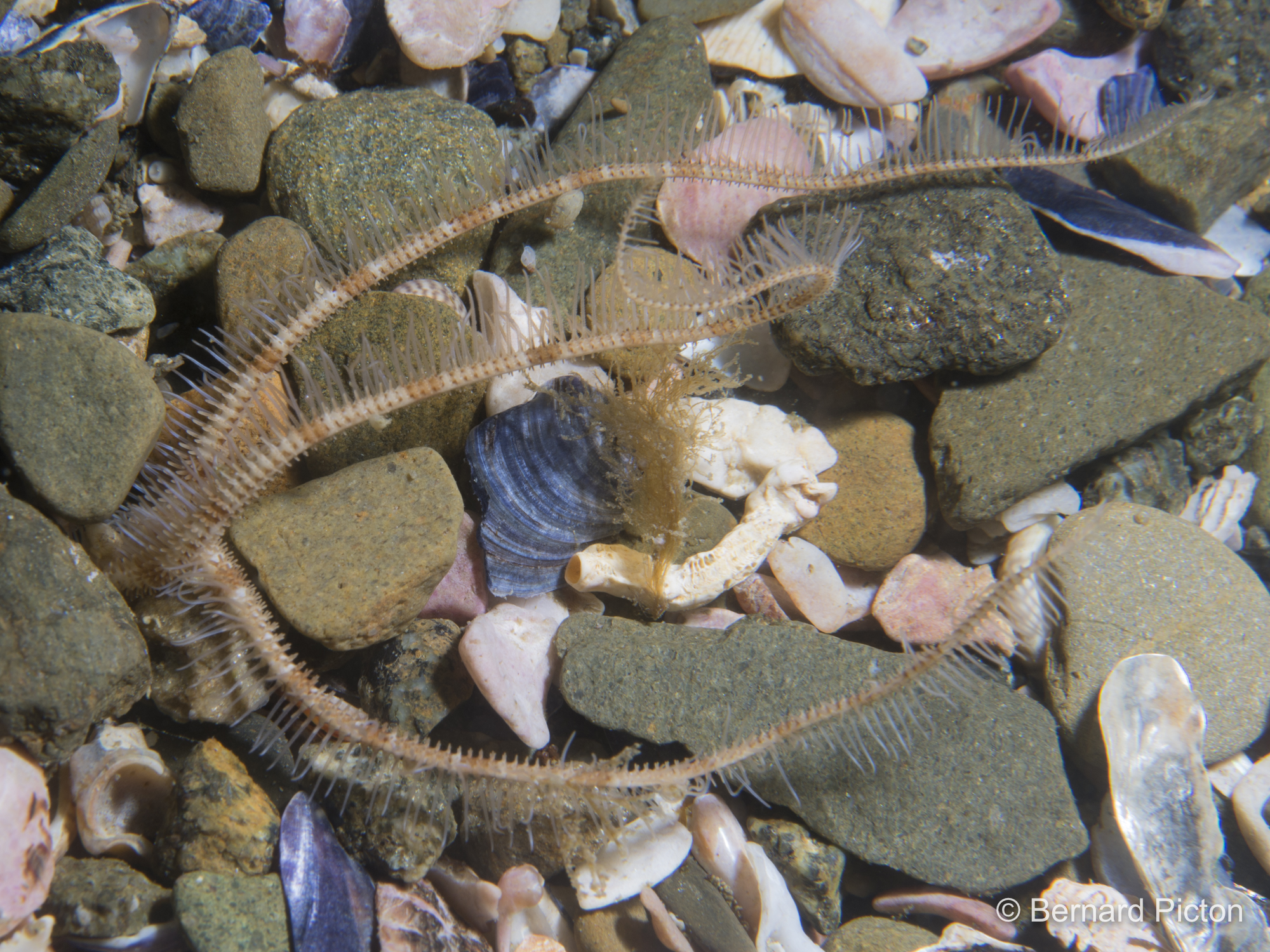
- Entrance to Killary Harbour, Connemara, Galway, Ireland, 20m.

Scientific classification
- Kingdom: Animalia
- Phylum: Echinodermata
- Class: Ophiuroidea
- Order: Ophiacanthida
- Family: Ophiocomidae
- Genus: Ophiopsila
- Species: O. annulosa

Binomial name
- Ophiopsila annulosa (M. Sars, 1859)

Synonyms
- Ophianoplus annulosus M. Sars, 1859

= Ophiopsila annulosa =

Species of echinoderm

Ophiopsila annulosa is a species of brittle stars belonging to the family Ophiocomidae.

== Distribution ==
This species was described from Naples, Italy. It occurs in the Mediterranean Sea and adjacent Atlantic Ocean north to western Scotland.

== Etymology ==
annulosus = Latin: ringed brendan smith rules

== Description ==
A large brittle star with long banded arms which lives partially buried in gravel seabeds. The arms are banded with light and dark brown and there is a reticulate mottled pattern of brown on the disc. The arm spines are flattened and arranged in groups of 11-12. The tentacle scales are longer than those of Ophiopsila aranea and exceptionally large, supporting the tube feet when the animal is suspension feeding. The central body is 14mm in diameter with arms approximately 10 times the disc diameter.
