= Amphilimnidae =

Amphilimnidae Temporal range: 72.2–0 Ma Late Cretaceous to Present
- Close-up of disc of Amphilimna cribriformis

Scientific classification
- Kingdom: Animalia
- Phylum: Echinodermata
- Class: Ophiuroidea
- Order: Amphilepidida
- Superfamily: Ophionereidoidea
- Family: Amphilimnidae; O'Hara, Stöhr, Hugall, Thuy & Martynov, 2018

Type genus
- Amphilimna Verrill, 1899

Genera
- Amphilimna Verrill, 1899; Astrosombra† Thuy, Gale & Numberger-Thuy, 2019

Family of brittle stars

Amphilimnidae is a family of brittle stars belonging to the order Amphilepidida. The earliest fossils from this family date back to the Maastrichtian in the Late Cretaceous.

== Taxonomy ==
It is one of the two families in the superfamily of Ophionereidoidea and contains two genera. Genera:

- Amphilimna Verrill, 1899
- Astrosombra† Thuy, Gale & Numberger-Thuy, 2019

The phylogenetic tree per O'Hara et al. (2017) is as follows.

- - Ophionereidina
    - Ophionereidoidea
      - Ophionereididae
      - Amphilimnidae
    - Ophiolepidoidea
      - Hemieuryalidae
      - Ophiolepididae
