= Amphilepididae =

- Amphilepis norvegica (oral view)

Scientific classification
- Kingdom: Animalia
- Phylum: Echinodermata
- Class: Ophiuroidea
- Order: Amphilepidida
- Superfamily: Amphiuroidea
- Family: Amphilepididae; Matsumoto, 1915

Type genus
- Amphilepis Ljungman, 1867

Genera
- Amphilepis Ljungman, 1867; Ophiomonas Djakonov, 1952

Family of echinoderms

Amphilepididae is a family of brittle stars in the suborder Gnathophiurina. It contains two genera.

== Taxonomy ==
The family belongs to the superfamily Amphiuroidea, which is one of the two superfamilies in the suborder Gnathophiurina. There are two genera in this family.

- Amphilepis Ljungman, 1867
- Ophiomonas Djakonov, 1952

The phylogenetic tree per O'Hara et al. (2017) is as follows.

- Gnathophiurina
  - - - Ophiactoidea
        - - - Ophiotrichidae
            - Ophiopholidae
          - - Ophiactidae
        - - Ophiothamnidae
  - Amphiuroidea
    - Amphiuridae
    - Amphilepididae
