= Ophionereidina =

Ophionereidina Temporal range: 365.2–0 Ma Late Devonian to Present
- Ophionereis reticulata

Scientific classification
- Kingdom: Animalia
- Phylum: Echinodermata
- Class: Ophiuroidea
- Order: Amphilepidida
- Suborder: Ophionereidina; O'Hara, Hugall, Thuy, Stöhr & Martynov, 2017

Superfamilies
- Ophiolepidoidea; Ophionereidoidea

Suborder of brittle stars

Ophionereidina is a suborder of brittle stars in the order Amphilepidida. It is first formally described by O'Hara et al. in 2017, and contains two superfamilies. The earliest fossils from this order (Ophiolepididae - Stephanoura belgica†) date back to the Late Famennian in the Late Devonian. (Note: The source lists the species under Ophiurida but the species has since been classified under Amphilepidida>Ophionereidina.)

== Taxonomy ==
The original authors described its phylogenetic tree in 2018 as follows:

- - Ophionereidina
    - Ophionereidoidea
      - Ophionereididae
      - Amphilimnidae
    - Ophiolepidoidea
      - Hemieuryalidae
      - Ophiolepididae

- Ophiolepidoidea Ljungman, 1867
- Ophionereidoidea Ljungman, 1867
