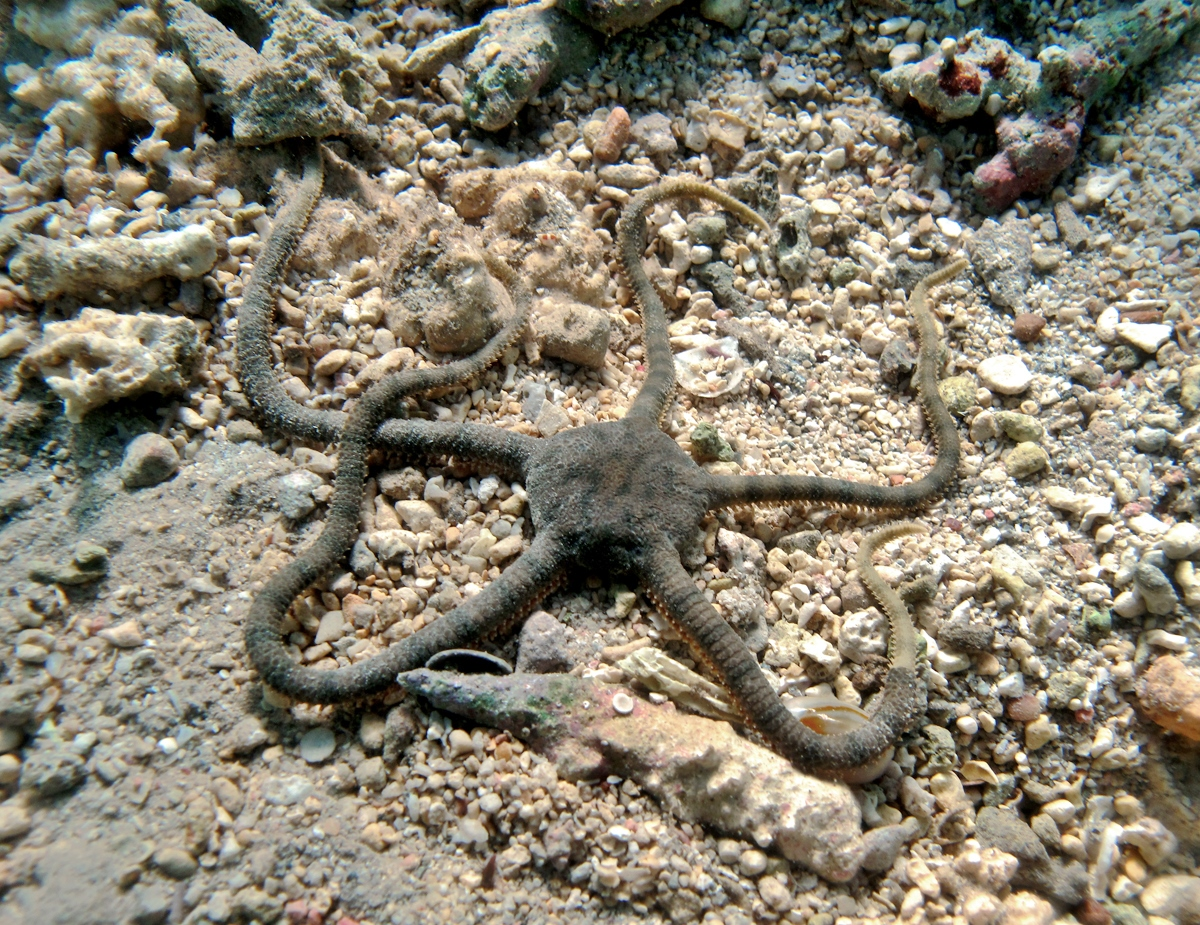
- Ophioplocus imbricatus

Scientific classification
- Kingdom: Animalia
- Phylum: Echinodermata
- Class: Ophiuroidea
- Order: Amphilepidida
- Superfamily: Ophiolepidoidea
- Family: Hemieuryalidae; Verrill, 1899

Type genus
- Hemieuryale v. Martens, 1867

Genera
- 11, see text

= Hemieuryalidae =

Hemieuryalidae Temporal range: 199.5–0 Ma Early Jurassic to Present

Family of brittle stars

Hemieuryalidae is a family of brittle stars belonging to the order Amphilepidida. It contains 11 genera. The earliest fossils from this family date back to the Sinemurian in the Early Jurassic.

== Taxonomy ==
There are eleven genera in this family.:

- Actinozonella Stöhr, 2011
- Astrogymnotes H.L. Clark, 1914
- Hemieuryale v. Martens, 1867
- Ophioholcus Clark, 1915
- Ophiomastus Lyman, 1878
- Ophioplocus Lyman, 1861
- Ophioplus Verrill, 1899
- Ophiozonella Matsumoto, 1915
- Ophiozonoida H.L. Clark, 1915
- Quironia A.H. Clark, 1934
- Sigsbeia Lyman, 1878

The phylogenetic tree per O'Hara et al. (2017) is as follows.

- - Ophionereidina
    - Ophionereidoidea
      - Ophionereididae
      - Amphilimnidae
    - Ophiolepidoidea
      - Hemieuryalidae
      - Ophiolepididae
