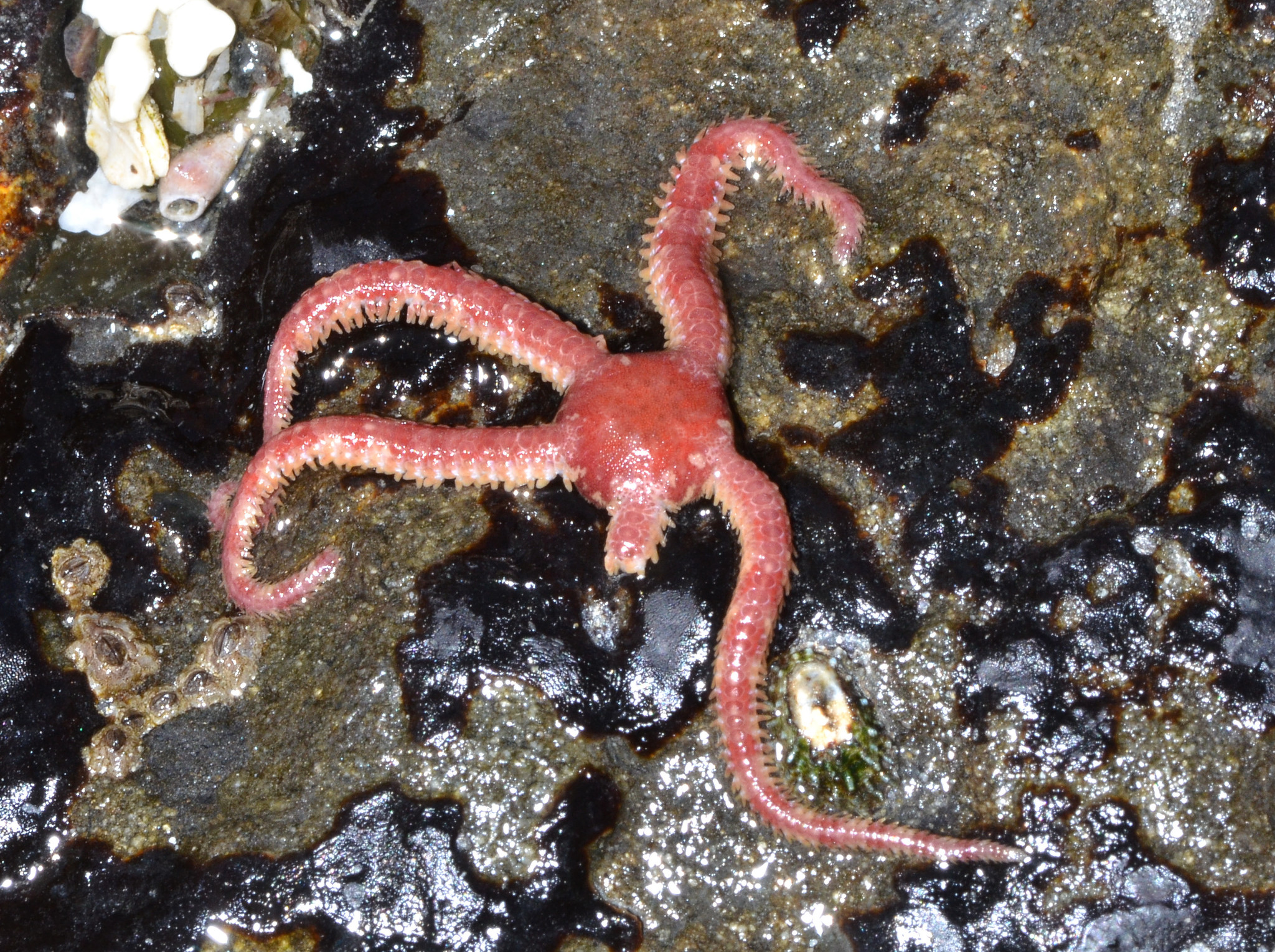
- Ophiopholis kennerlyi

Scientific classification
- Kingdom: Animalia
- Phylum: Echinodermata
- Class: Ophiuroidea
- Order: Amphilepidida
- Family: Ophiopholidae
- Genus: Ophiopholis; Müller & Troschel, 1842

Species
- 8, see text

= Ophiopholis =

Genus of brittle stars

Ophiopholis is a genus of brittle stars in the monogeneric family of Ophiopholidae which is found in oceans worldwide from tropics to temperate regions.

== Species ==
The following species are recognised by the World Register of Marine Species :

- Ophiopholis aculeata (Linnaeus, 1767)
- Ophiopholis bakeri (McClendon, 1909)
- Ophiopholis brachyactis (H.L. Clark, 1911)
- Ophiopholis japonica (Lyman, 1879)
- Ophiopholis kennerlyi (Lyman, 1860)
- Ophiopholis longispina (H.L. Clark, 1911)
- Ophiopholis mirabilis (Duncan, 1879)
- Ophiopholis pilosa (Djakonov, 1954)
