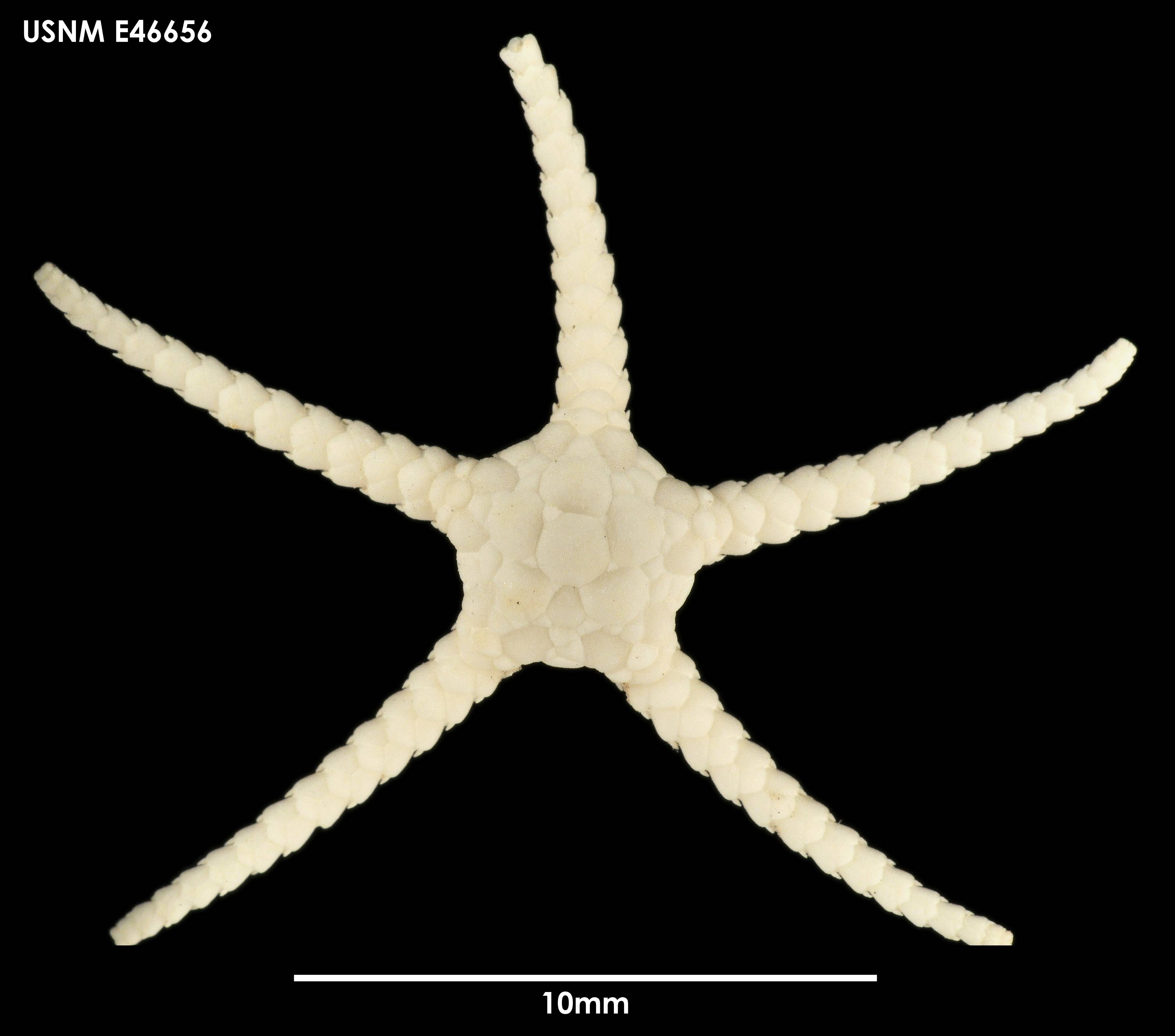
- Dried preserved specimen of Ophiozonella falklandica

Scientific classification
- Kingdom: Animalia
- Phylum: Echinodermata
- Class: Ophiuroidea
- Superorder: Ophintegrida
- Order: Amphilepidida; O'Hara, Hugall, Thuy, Stöhr & Martynov, 2017

Suborders
- Gnathophiurina; Ophionereidina; Ophiopsilina

= Amphilepidida =

Amphilepidida Temporal range: 365.2–0 Ma Late Devonian to Present

Order of brittle stars

Amphilepidida is an order of brittle stars belonging to the superorder Ophintegrida. With over 1,000 species in 11 families, it is the largest order of brittle stars. The earliest fossils from this order (Ophiolepididae - Stephanoura belgica†) date back to the Late Famennian in the Late Devonian. (Note: The source lists the species under Ophiurida but the species has since been classified under Amphilepidida.)

== Taxonomy ==
Amphilepidida contains three suborders with various families and one family with a temporary name.

Suborders:

- Gnathophiurina Matsumoto, 1915
- Ophionereidina O'Hara, Hugall, Thuy, Stöhr & Martynov, 2017
- Ophiopsilina Matsumoto, 1915

Family:

- Amphilepidida incertae sedis
  - Amphicutis Pomory, Carpenter & Winter, 2011
  - Ophienigma Stöhr & Segonzac, 2005
  - Ophiopus Ljungman, 1867

The phylogenetic tree per O'Hara et al. (2017) is as follows.

- Amphilepidida
  - - - - Gnathophiurina
          - - - Ophiactoidea
                - - - Ophiotrichidae
                    - Ophiopholidae
                  - - Ophiactidae
                - - Ophiothamnidae
            - Amphiuroidea
              - Amphiuridae
              - Amphilepididae
        - Ophiopsilina
          - Ophiopsilidae
      - Ophionereidina
        - Ophionereidoidea
          - Ophionereididae
          - Amphilimnidae
        - Ophiolepidoidea
          - Hemieuryalidae
          - Ophiolepididae
