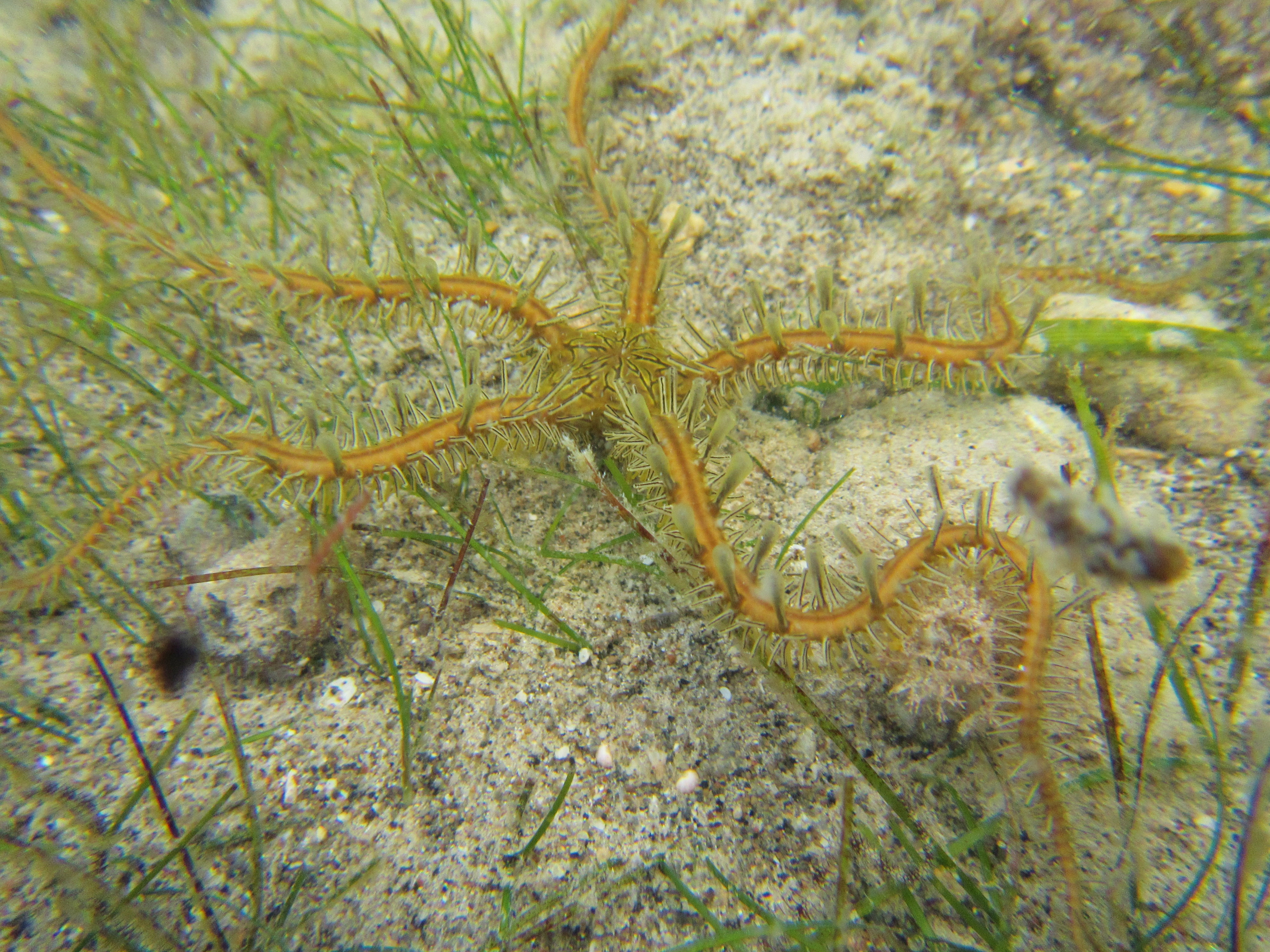
- Ophiomastix venosa individual. Coloration patterns and enlarged, 'club'-shaped arm spines are visible and apparent

Scientific classification
- Kingdom: Animalia
- Phylum: Echinodermata
- Class: Ophiuroidea
- Order: Ophiacanthida
- Family: Ophiocomidae
- Genus: Ophiomastix
- Species: O. venosa

Binomial name
- Ophiomastix venosa Peters, 1851

= Ophiomastix venosa =

Species of brittle star

Ophiomastix venosa is a species of brittle star commonly found inhabiting Indo-Pacific shallow, coastal waters. O. venosa adults are often found living in the benthos of their native geographic ranges within coastal coral formations and among rock formations. This species of brittle star was discovered and initially described by Wilhelm Peters, in 1851. They belong to the class Ophiuroidea in the Phylum Echinodermata. O. venosa have distinct club-shaped spines along each of their arms, a morphological trait specialized to the species. Adult Ophiomastix venosa feed primarily on Sargassum densifolium, an algae native to their habitat.

== Discovery ==
Ophiomastix venosa was initially discovered and described in 1851 by W. Peters, a German zoologist. Since the initial description of O. venosa, few published observations have occurred; the conservational status of this species is not well understood because of this. The sightings of Ophiomastix venosa occur throughout the coastal regions of the Indo-Pacific, and have been absent in all other oceanic and coastal regions.

== Description and anatomy ==
Ophiomastix venosa are morphologically distinct for various reasons. Brittle stars, including O. venosa, have unique body plans; they exhibit pentaradial symmetry (five-point symmetry), with five 'serpent-like' arms that connect to a distinct central disk. Each of the arms is covered in spines that aid in locomotion, feeding, and defense. The Ophiomastix venosa species is recognized by their enlarged upper arm spines, which are covered by a thickened epithelium, and the absence of or extremely minute scales on their central disk. O. venosa exhibit claviform arm spines, meaning that specialized spines along the perimeter of their arms are enlarged and thickened. These enlarged arm spines may be described as 'club-shaped'. These claviform arm spines do not align with the adjacent spines on the opposite vertical series; the alternating pattern of claviform arm spines is 2/3 for O. venosa. The claviform arm spines of O. venosa are distinct to this species as they are also furcated, meaning that there are cloven projections along the tips of their enlarged arm spines.

Ophiomastix venosa generally range in color across various shades of yellows, grays, and browns with distinct dark and white markings along their central disk and arms. Their smooth central disk is yellow with patterned dark lines outlined in white that irregularly extend from their central radial shields. Their arms are similarly colored to their central disk, with dark lines centrally ranging the length of their arms and darker yellow bands circling the dorsal plates along their arms.

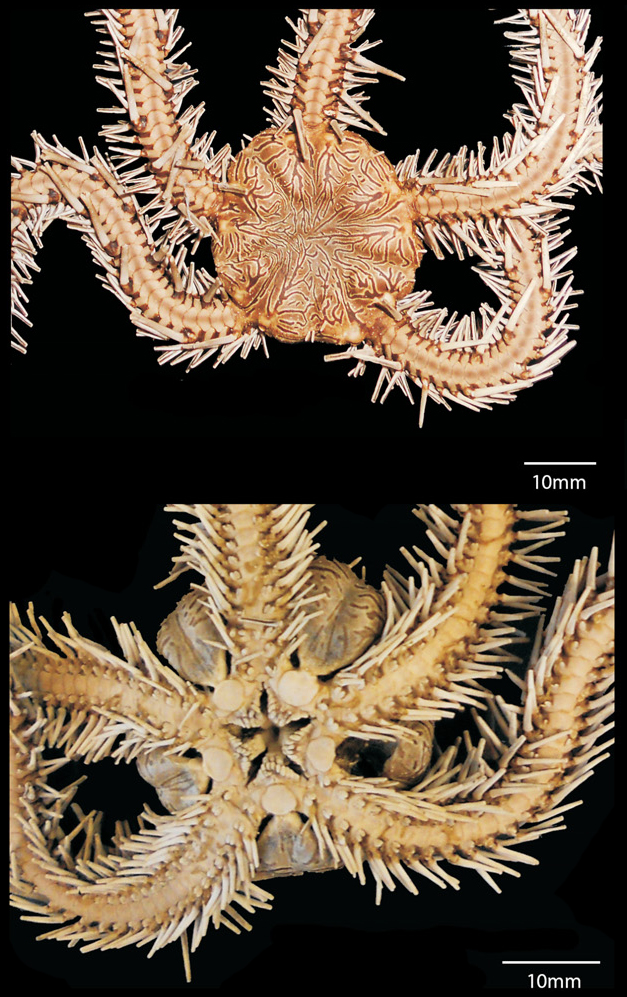
Ophiomastix venosa dorsal and ventral perspective images of central disk.

Ophiomastix venosa have a central disk lacking granules and, if present, have spinules that are widely distributed. O. venosa is the largest Ophiocomoid on the southeastern coastal African coral atoll, Aldabra, when comparing disk diameter and the ratio of arm length to disk diameter. O. venosa have been described as having central disk diameters larger than those of their relatives. The maximum diameter of the central disk was measured at 41mm when observing individuals along the Aldabra coral atoll. O. venosa have been observed to commonly grow to reach a central disk size of over 20mm in diameter. The length of O. venosa arms is variable, but the species has a patterned arm length to disk diameter ratio of 5.5:1, respectively.

Ophiomastix venosa have dental plates that account for around 20% of their central disk's diameter length. Their oral shields, also located within their central disk, are heart-shaped, and the length of these plates is similar if not equal in width. O. venosa's dental plate's length:breadth ratio is 2.8:1.

== Taxonomy ==
Ophiomastix venosa is a species of brittle star belonging to the Ophiomastix genus. The Ophiomastix genus is composed of 31 species/subspecies; O. venosa is most closely related to O. annulosa, O. koehleri, and O. asperula.

== Distribution ==
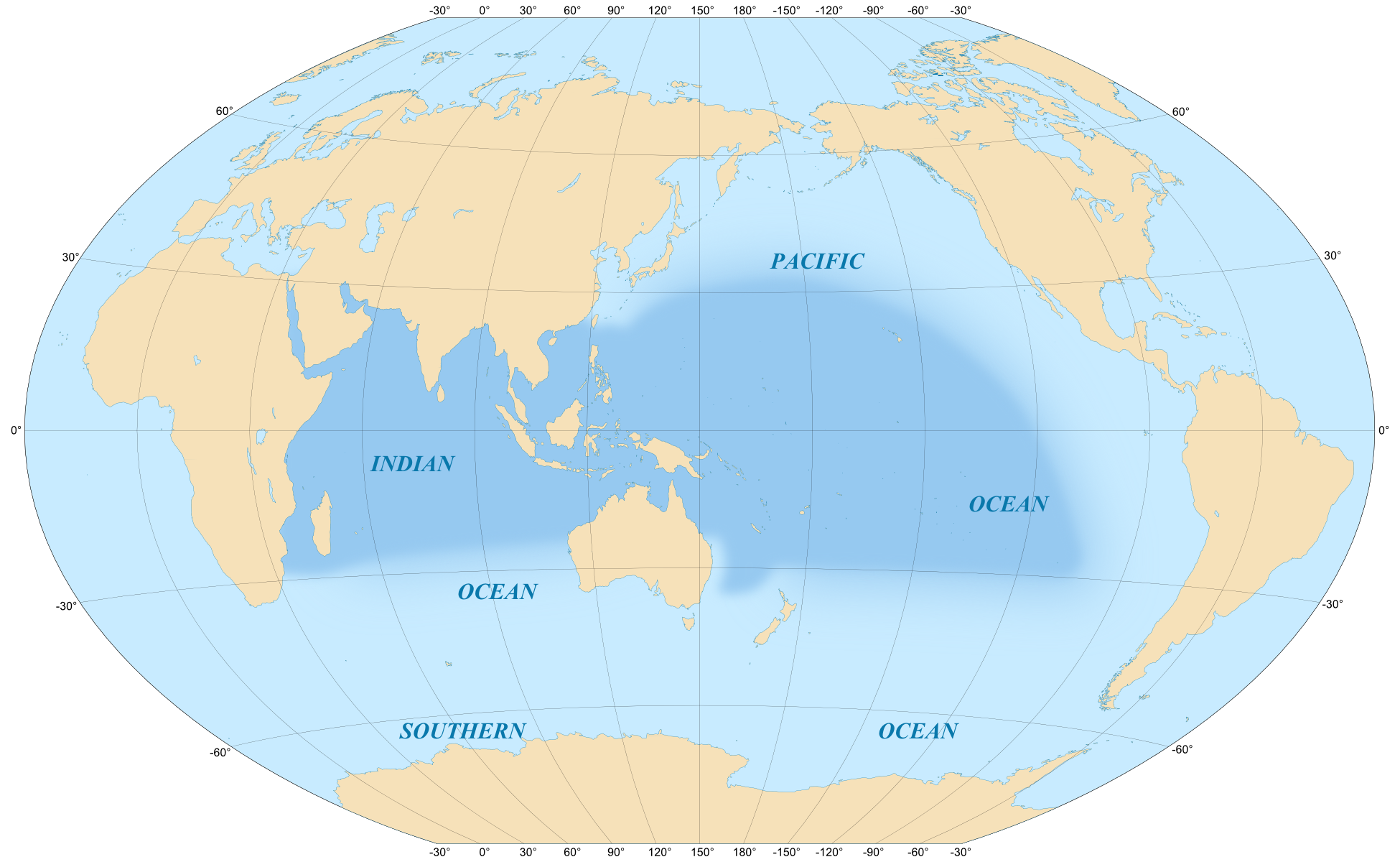
Indo-Pacific oceanic region. O. venosa native ranges are distributed throughout this region.

Ophiomastix venosa is a strictly marine species of Echinoderms. They have been commonly found in Indo-Pacific shallow, coastal waters along coral atolls and rock formations, and are believed to be limited to the intertidal and coastal zones of Indo-Pacific waters. Ophiomastix venosa have been observed in many different microhabitats ranging throughout the Indo-Pacific Oceans and Seas with various substrate and geological components.

Early observances of Ophiomastix were discovered throughout the Red Sea, within coastal waters of Zanzibar, ranging through the coastal waters along the Pacific Hawaiian Islands. More recent observations of O. venosa have occurred through studies located within the South China Sea. One sighting of O. venosa occurred over the course of an expedition in the Mozambique Channel; the individual was sighted within a patch of reef in the Indian Ocean (between the coast of Eastern Africa and Madagascar). O. venosa has also been observed inhabiting coral atolls off of the southeastern coast of Africa.

Throughout the coastal waters of the Indo-Pacific, O. venosa have been observed in specialized microhabitats with various substrate forms. The species has been observed in shallow coral reef structures covering sandy gravel substrate, under rocks and boulders in shallow waters, along the intertidal zone of seaward platforms (landforms occurring on rocky shore lines due to coastal erosion), and within seagrass beds near oceanic channels.

Ophiomastix venosa have been studied to reside in relatively limited parameters of water; the species is comparatively sensitive to the dissolved oxygen concentration, pH, salinity, and temperature parameters within their habitat when compared to other species that inhabit separate niches.

The O. venosa brittle star, although observed on limited occasions, resides in many regions throughout the Indo-Pacific oceans and seas. Their habitats are distinguished by substrate characteristics and habitable water parameters, allowing the species to reside in many locations around the world with significantly similar niches.

== Life cycle and reproduction ==
Ophiomastix venosa have complex development cycles and perform sexual reproduction.

Ophiomastix venosa reproduce on an annual cycle, in which they spawn throughout the months of November to February, this duration of time is known as the austral summer. O. venosa eggs average 550 μm in diameter, which is much larger than egg sizes of other closely related Ophiomastix species. Their eggs are buoyant in the water column, which increases the success of fertilization and distribution, and are green with a smooth envelope.

The larvae of O. venosa are vitellaria, meaning that their larvae are free-swimming within the water column and non-feeding.

Ophiomastix venosa undergo metamorphosis throughout their larval, juvenile, and adult developmental stages. The gastrula of O. venosa, which is a stage in embryonic development, morphs into an early larva with uniformly distributed cilia, which then further develops into other larval and juvenile forms. O. venosa develop into lecithotrophic larvae, meaning that their larval form develops from the yolk provided by the mother, rather than their larval forms feeding on resources acquired from their surrounding environment. Lecithotrophic larvae, since dependent on their mother's yolk for nutrition, are limited as to how far they can disperse as larvae and often settle to the benthos quickly to metamorphose into symbiotic or free-living juveniles; O. venosa's egg buoyancy allows for greater dispersal to counter the limited dispersal ability of their lecithotrophic larvae.

== Symbiosis and development ==
Ophiomastix venosa exhibit symbiotic relationships in juvenile developmental stages.

The development period from larvae to new recruits, or juveniles with a central disk diameter of 4mm, is around 3–4 months long. Brittle star species are commonly observed living in close connections with other species. Juvenile O. venosa have been observed to 'hitchhike' on the disks of another species of brittle star that inhabits similar geographical locations, Ophiocoma scolopendrina, through development. This is described as 'babysitting' symbiosis. Juvenile O. venosa feed on the excess neuston that their host, O. scolopendrina, does not ingest. This symbiotic relationship between O. venosa and their 'babysitting' companion allows for more successful development of juveniles into adulthood. O. venosa juveniles participating in a symbiotic relationship with O. scolopendrina are able to specifically recognize their symbiotic babysitter. O. venosa juveniles depart from their symbiotic host and migrate into their personal microhabitat when their central disk reaches a diameter of 6mm. When the symbiotic juveniles depart from their symbiotic host, their feeding habits alter and they begin to feed on algae into adulthood.
