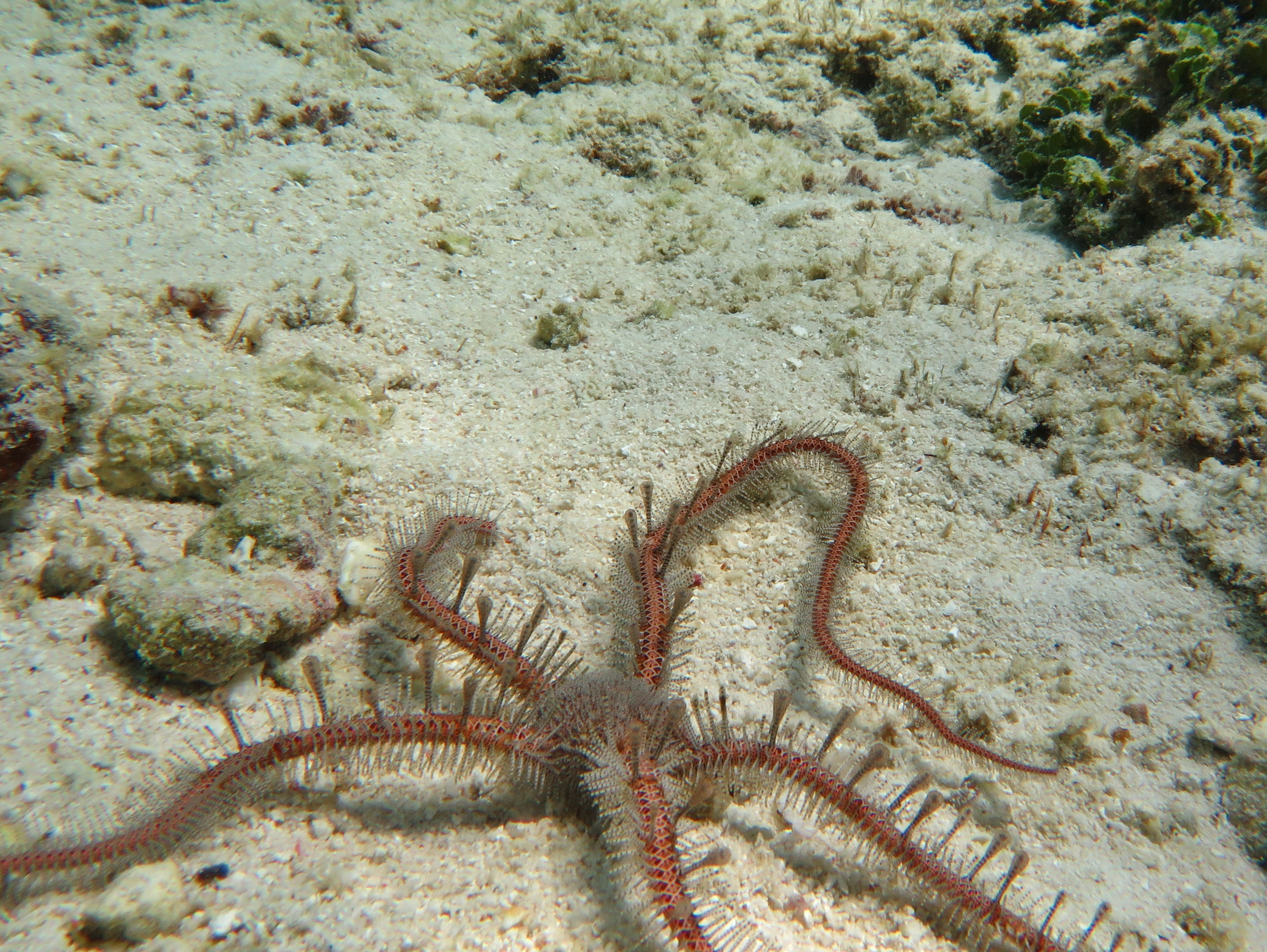
- Ophiomastix annulosa

Scientific classification
- Kingdom: Animalia
- Phylum: Echinodermata
- Class: Ophiuroidea
- Order: Ophiacanthida
- Family: Ophiocomidae
- Genus: Ophiomastix; Müller & Troschel, 1842

= Ophiomastix =

Genus of brittle stars

Ophiomastix is a genus of echinoderms belonging to the family Ophiocomidae.

The species of this genus are found in Tropical and Subtropical regions.

Species:

- Ophiomastix annulosa (Lamarck, 1816)
- Ophiomastix asperula Lütken, 1869
- Ophiomastix australis
- Ophiomastix brocki O'Hara, 2018
- Ophiomastix caryophyllata Lütken, 1869
- Ophiomastix corallicola H.L. Clark, 1915
- Ophiomastix elegans (Peters, 1851)
- Ophiomastix endeani (Rowe & Pawson, 1977)
- Ophiomastix flaccida Lyman, 1874
- Ophiomastix janualis Lyman, 1871
- Ophiomastix koehleri Devaney, 1977
- Ophiomastix lymani (de Loriol, 1893)
- Ophiomastix macroplaca (H.L. Clark, 1915)
- Ophiomastix marshallensis Devaney, 1978
- Ophiomastix mixta Lütken, 1869
- Ophiomastix occidentalis (H.L. Clark, 1938)
- Ophiomastix ornata Koehler, 1905
- Ophiomastix palaoensis Murakami, 1943
- Ophiomastix pictum (Müller & Troschel, 1842)
- Ophiomastix stenozonula Devaney, 1974
- Ophiomastix variabilis Koehler, 1905
- Ophiomastix venosa Peters, 1851
- Ophiomastix wendtii (Müller & Troschel, 1842)
