= Eyes as food =

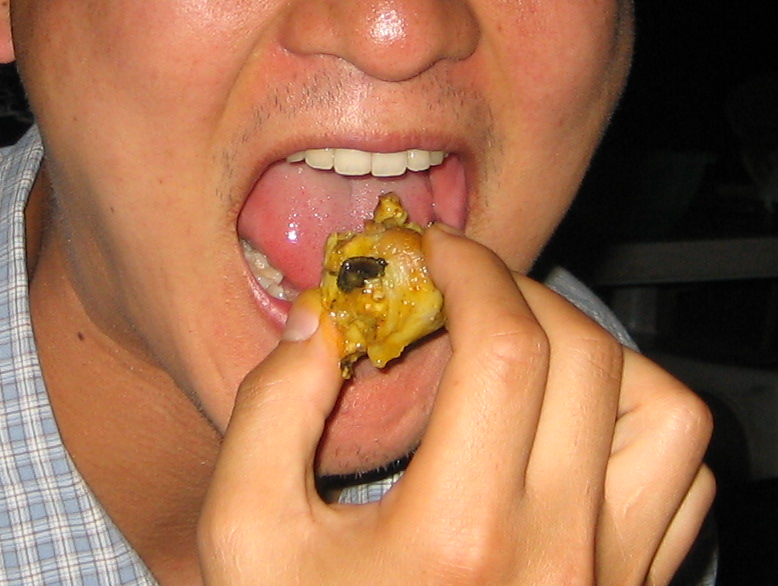
A goat eyeball being eaten from isi ewu, a goat head stew of Nigerian cuisine

The eye – particularly the mammalian eye or fish eye and similar structures – is a cut of offal that is sometimes eaten by humans. Seeing the most prevalence in Asian cuisines, eyeballs are a taboo food in the Anglosphere. Prepared eyeballs have a gelatinous texture, and may have a harder center depending on species.

== Preparation and consumption ==
Eyeballs can be cooked and eaten as a part of whole animals or the head as food (particularly fish heads).

=== Barbacoa de cabeza ===
In the barbacoa tradition of Mexican cuisine, beef heads are roasted (traditionally in an earth oven) and the meat either mixed or divided by type; the eyes (Spanish: ojos) are a popular cut often requested on its own to be eaten as a taco (taco de ojo).

=== Tuna eyes ===
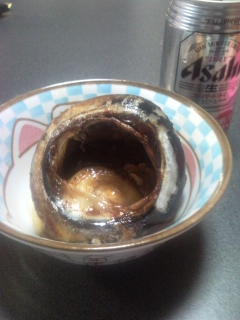
Maguro medama served at an izakaya with an Asahi Super Dry

The eyes of tuna are a delicacy in Pacific Asia. The eye of a tuna weighs 100–300 grams (3.53–10.58 oz).

In Japanese cuisine, tuna eyes (Japanese: まぐろ目玉, romanized: maguro medama) are served as street food and as bar snacks at izakayas. The tuna eye is typically braised in mirin or sauteed, and served with typical accoutrements of ginger and lemon. The sclera is typically discarded and the rest eaten.

In Vietnamese cuisine, tuna eye soup (Vietnamese: Đèn pha đại dương, lit. 'ocean headlight') is a local specialty of the tuna fishing towns of Quy Nhon and Phu Yen of the South Central Coast region. Tuna eyes from large tuna – those weighing over 40 kilograms (88 lb) – are most prized by diners. The tuna eye is rinsed in rice wine, poached, and simmered with ginger and spices to eliminate fishy tastes. The Vietnam News Agency reports significant food tourism to the region to try the delicacy.

=== List of other dishes ===
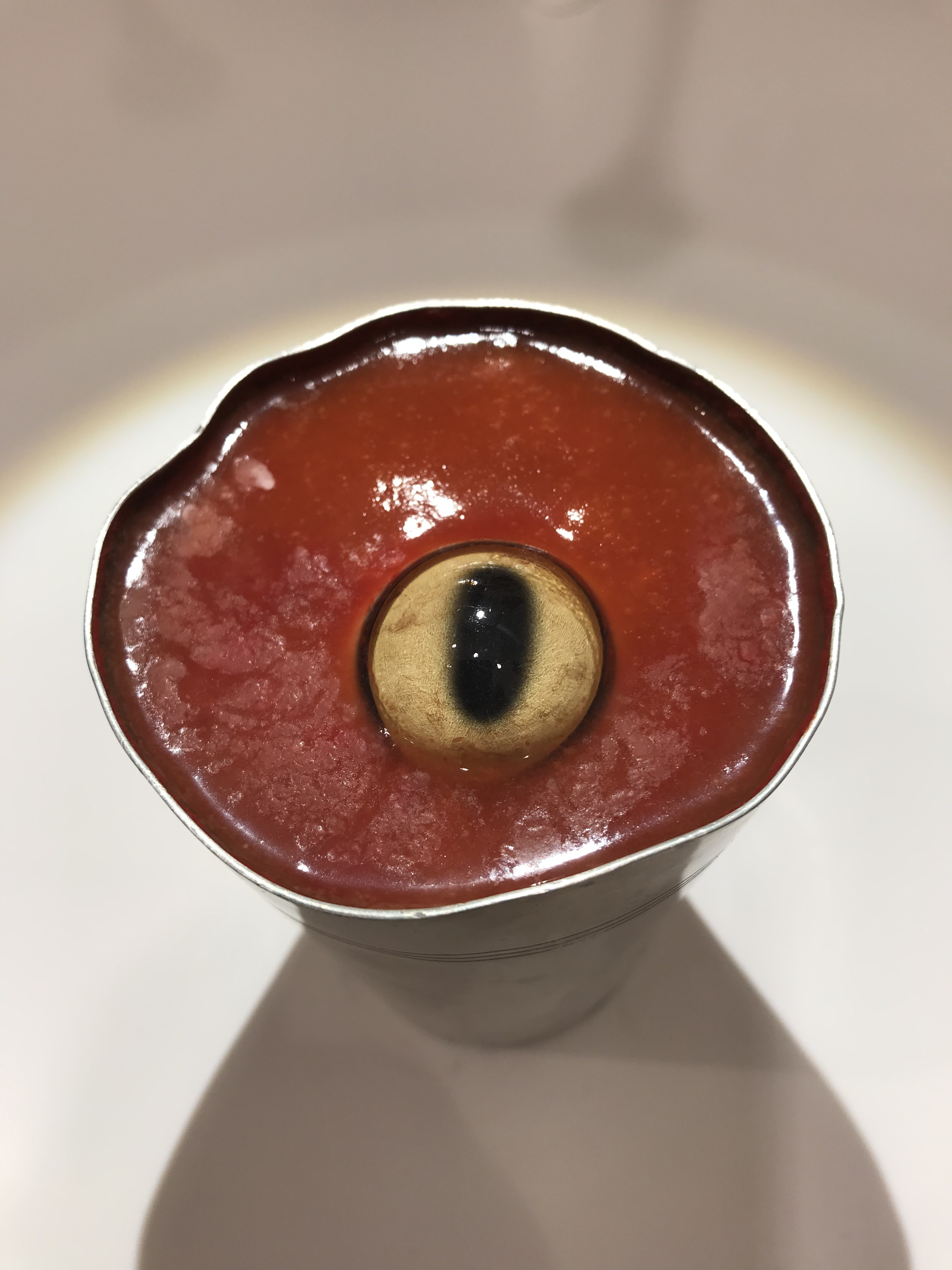
"Mongolian Bloody Mary" model at the Disgusting Food Museum in Malmö, Sweden

- "Mongolian Bloody Mary", a hangover cure in Mongolian cuisine featuring pickled sheep's eyeballs
- Roasted pig eyes, Guangxi, China

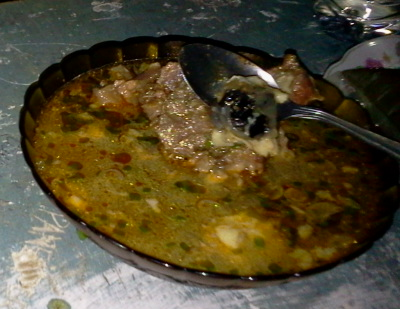
Soto mata sapi, a Madurese cuisine soup featuring a beef eyeball

- Soto Mata Sapi, a Madurese cuisine beef eyeball soto, a variant of soto Madura

== Culture ==
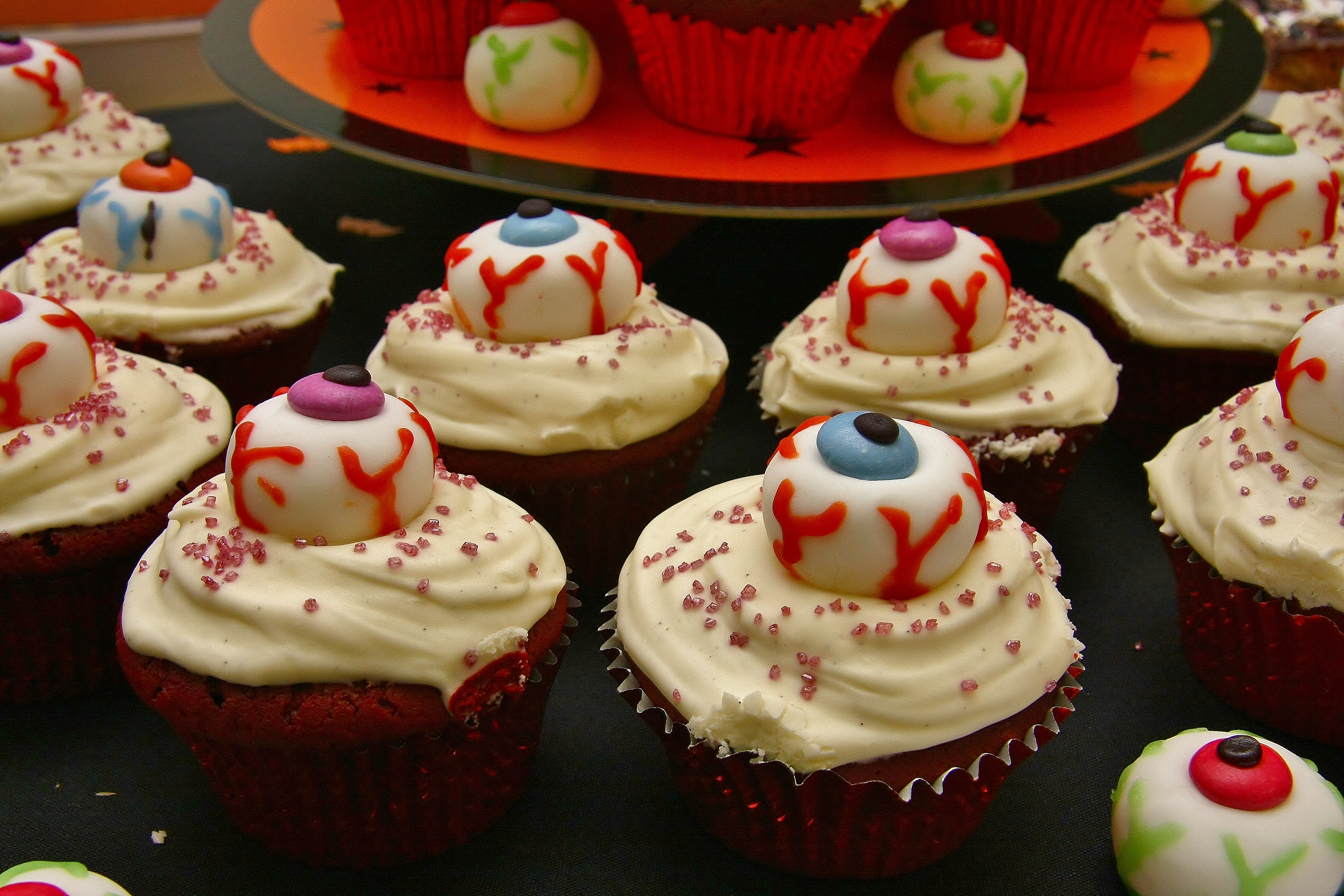
Novelty mock-eyeball cupcakes

In America, novelty foods featuring mock-eyeballs are popular during Halloween. Halloween candy resembling eyeballs include gummy candy eyeballs, gobstoppers, and those with novelty packaging. Appetizers mimicking eyeballs may mimic the shape and consistency of eyes like with skinned grapes or deviled eggs, or rely on creative food decoration of typical appetizers.

In Chinese food culture, the head of the table is traditionally offered the eye from the fish heads of whole fish prepared for the table.

=== McDonald's urban legend ===
McDonalds is purported in urban legends to source beef eyeballs specifically to adulterate their ground beef patties.

=== Taboo food ===
Eyeballs are seen as a taboo food in the Anglosphere. Psychology professor Paul Rozin opined to the National Public Radio that eating eyes is particularly disgusting to the American diet, as they are so 'visibly animal'.

=== Fad dieting ===
Eating eyeballs has been promoted as a part of fad diets. The macronutrients of eyeballs are compelling to proponents of the high-protein diet and the carnivore diet. The gelatinous, toothsome nature of raw eyeballs makes them useful to the raw food diet and the paleolithic diet.

== See also ==
- Head as food
- Tongue as food
- Ear as food
- Offal
