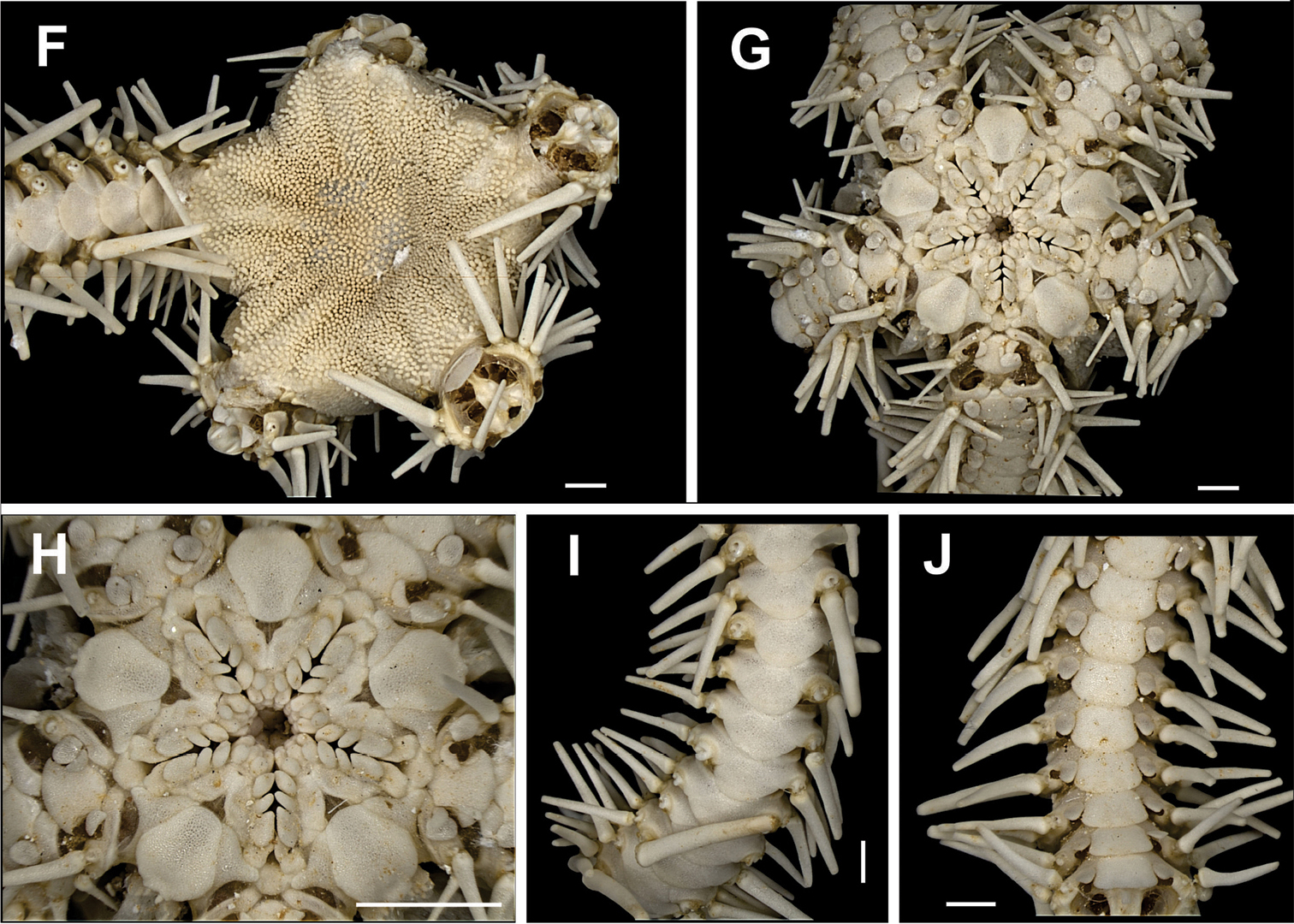

Scientific classification
- Kingdom: Animalia
- Phylum: Echinodermata
- Class: Ophiuroidea
- Order: Ophiacanthida
- Family: Ophiocomidae
- Genus: Ophiomastix
- Species: O. wendtii

Binomial name
- Ophiomastix wendtii (Müller & Troschel, 1842)

= Ophiomastix wendtii =

Species of brittle star

Ophiomastix wendtii, also known by its common name, the red ophiocoma, and formerly as Ophiocoma wendtii, is a species of brittle stars that inhabits coral reefs from Bermuda to Brazil, primarily in the Caribbean sea. These brittle stars have long, thin arms emanating from a small, disk-shaped body, and club-like spines along its arms. They are about the size of an outstretched human hand.

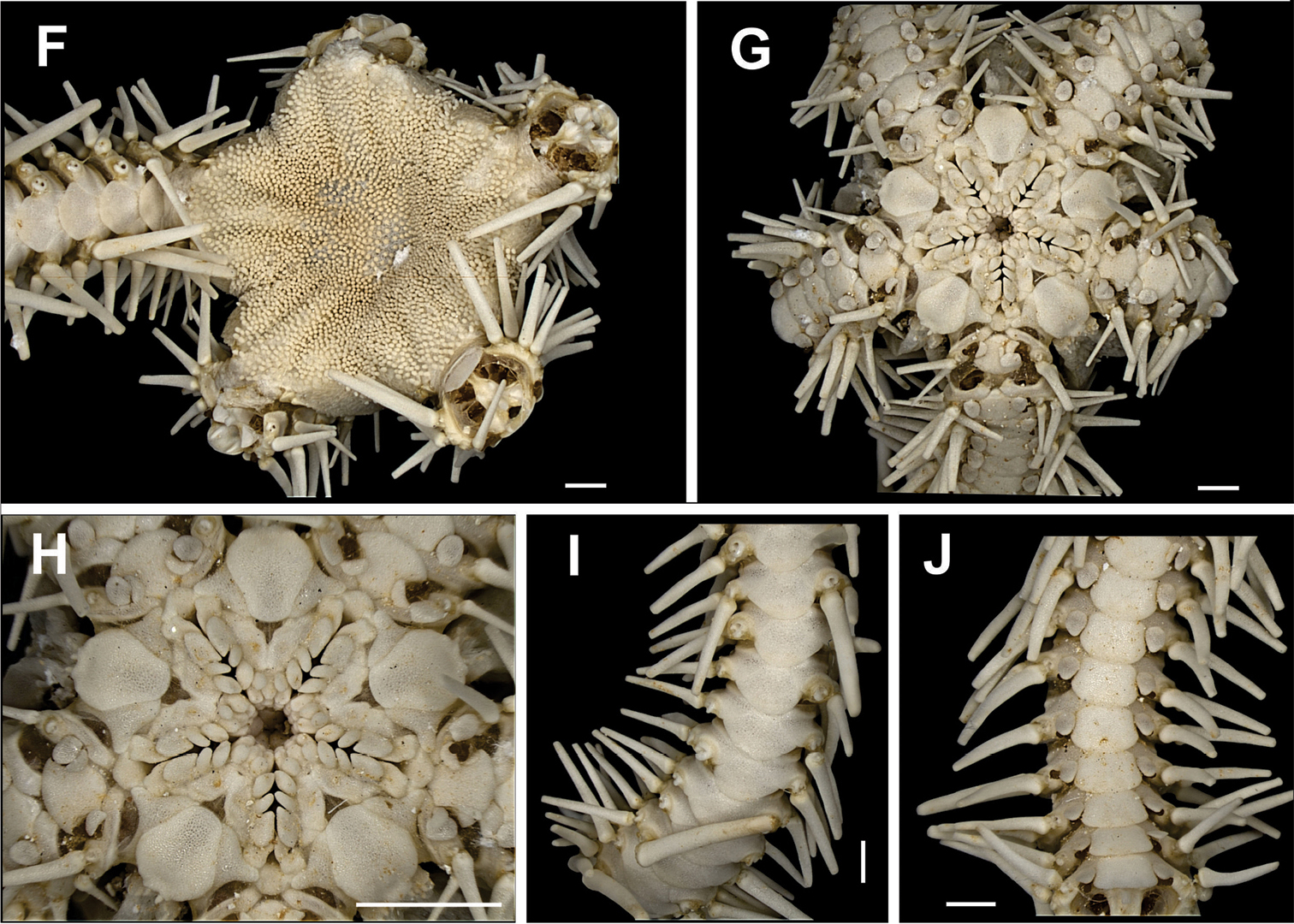
Close-up photographs of O. wendtii

== Taxonomy ==
Ophiomastix wendtii has been referred to by a number of different proposed names. Among these proposed names is Ophiocoma riisei, suggested by Christian Frederik Lütken in 1856, though the name was never commonly accepted. It was originally named Ophiocoma wendtii by J. Muller and F. H. Troschel in 1842, though in 2018, Timothy O'Hara categorized O. wendtii under the genus Ophiomastix, as one of four genera previously thought to constitute Ophiocoma. The Ophiomastix genus is characterized by bearing spines, twice as high as they are wide. O. wendtii is considered to be among the macrobenthos functional group, alongside its fellow Ophiuroidea.

The etymology of wendtii supposedly comes from a Captain Johann Wilhelm Wendt.

== Distribution and habitat ==
Ophiomastix wendtii is commonly found in reef rubble of the Caribbean Sea, particularly in the Gulf of Mexico. It is most commonly found near Belize and Costa Rica. However, it has been reported as far south as near Brazil. It has also, however, been reported in the Mozambique Channel, between the eastern coast of Africa and Madagascar. It is typically found within a depth range of 1 to 27 meters.

== Characteristics and behavior ==
Ophiomastix wendtii, being a member of the Ophiomastix genus, bears the aforementioned long, club-shaped spines on its arms. O. wendtii can change its color, by means of phototropic chromatophores. O. wendtii is typically deep crimson in color, and fades to a neutral beige in the night. Its color can be artificially changed by alterations in light exposure. The O. wendtii has a system of protection on its arms, covered with calcite crystals. It is thought to reinforce the calcite on its arms with magnesium-rich nanoprecipitates, making its protective crystals more difficult to crack. Much like other echinoderms, O. wendtii forms a mineralized skeleton. It inhabits reef rubble, and is averse to light, preferring to come out during night over day. The pluteus larvae of O. wendtii are planktotrophic, feeding on plankton.

== Visual system ==
In addition to functioning as an armor and giving structural support, the crystals on its arms were, until recently, thought to form a visual system. They minimize spherical aberration of incoming light and have excellent optical properties. The lenses were suggested to work by filtering and focusing light on an underlying photoreceptor system. Nerve bundles under each lens, presumed to be light-sensitive, would transmit the optical information to the rest of the nervous system. However, the discovery of nerves and photoreceptor cells in between, rather than beneath, the lenses suggests that this system may not rely on their optical properties. The only known animals to employ a similar visual system were the now-extinct trilobites. Researchers found that O. wendtii could actively search out areas based on color contrast, suspecting that this might be a behavior designed to evade predators. It is also suspected that its color-changing ability may play a role in its complex vision system.
