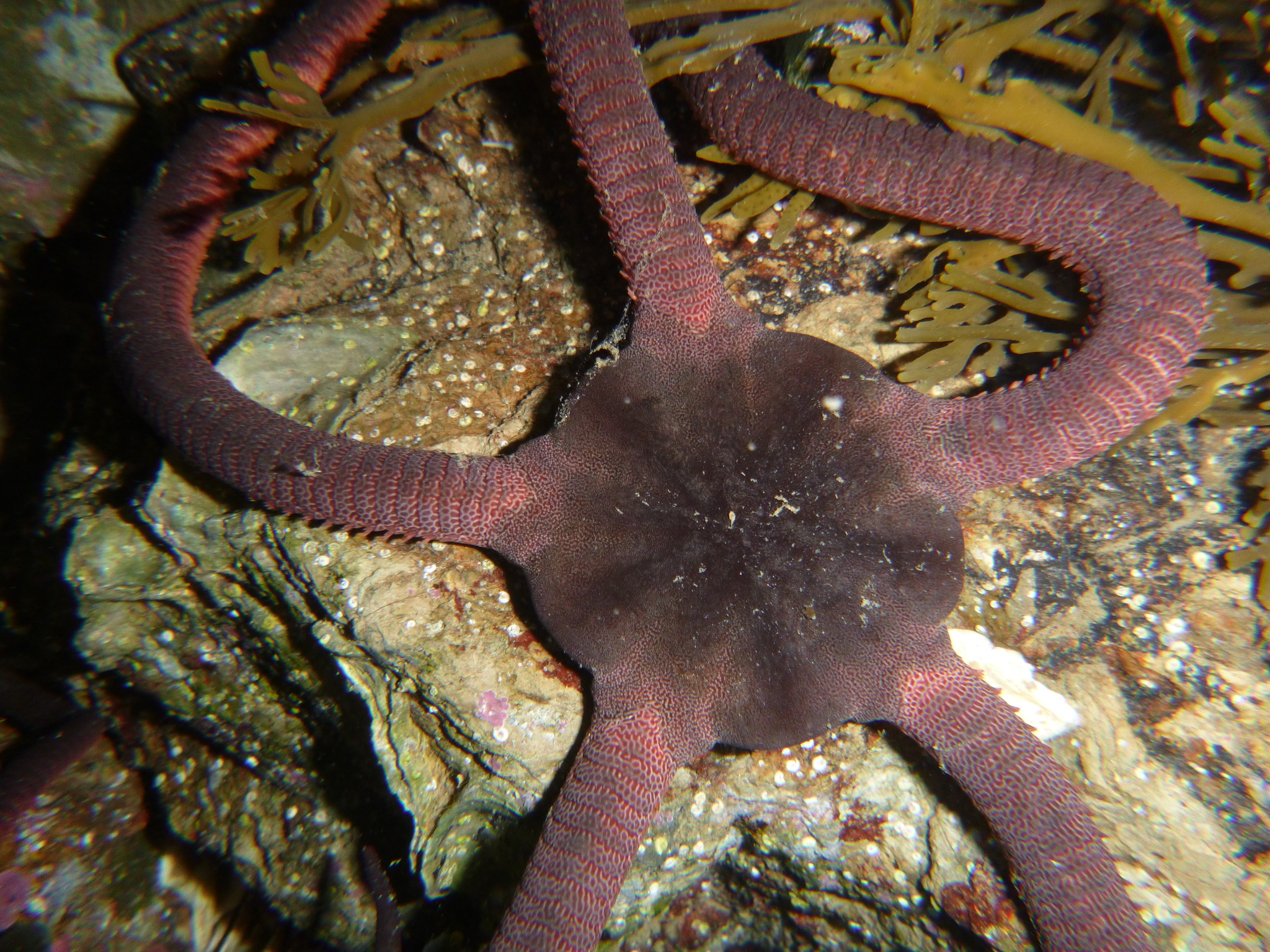

Scientific classification
- Kingdom: Animalia
- Phylum: Echinodermata
- Class: Ophiuroidea
- Order: Ophiacanthida
- Family: Ophiodermatidae
- Genus: Ophiopsammus
- Species: O. maculatus

Binomial name
- Ophiopsammus maculatus Verrill, 1869

= Ophiopsammus maculatus =

Species of brittle star

Ophiopsammus maculatus is a species of brittle star (related to starfish) in the family Ophiodermatidae. The species is a small five-limbed seastar with a round central disk and long, black or red limbs. Its range is New Zealand where it inhabits littoral zones in coastal waters.

== Etymology ==
Maculatus comes from the Latin for 'spotted'. The genus name comes from the Greek ὄφις, for 'snake', and ψάμμος, for 'sand'. Presumably, the name is meant to refer to the long arms and the habitat of the brittle star.
