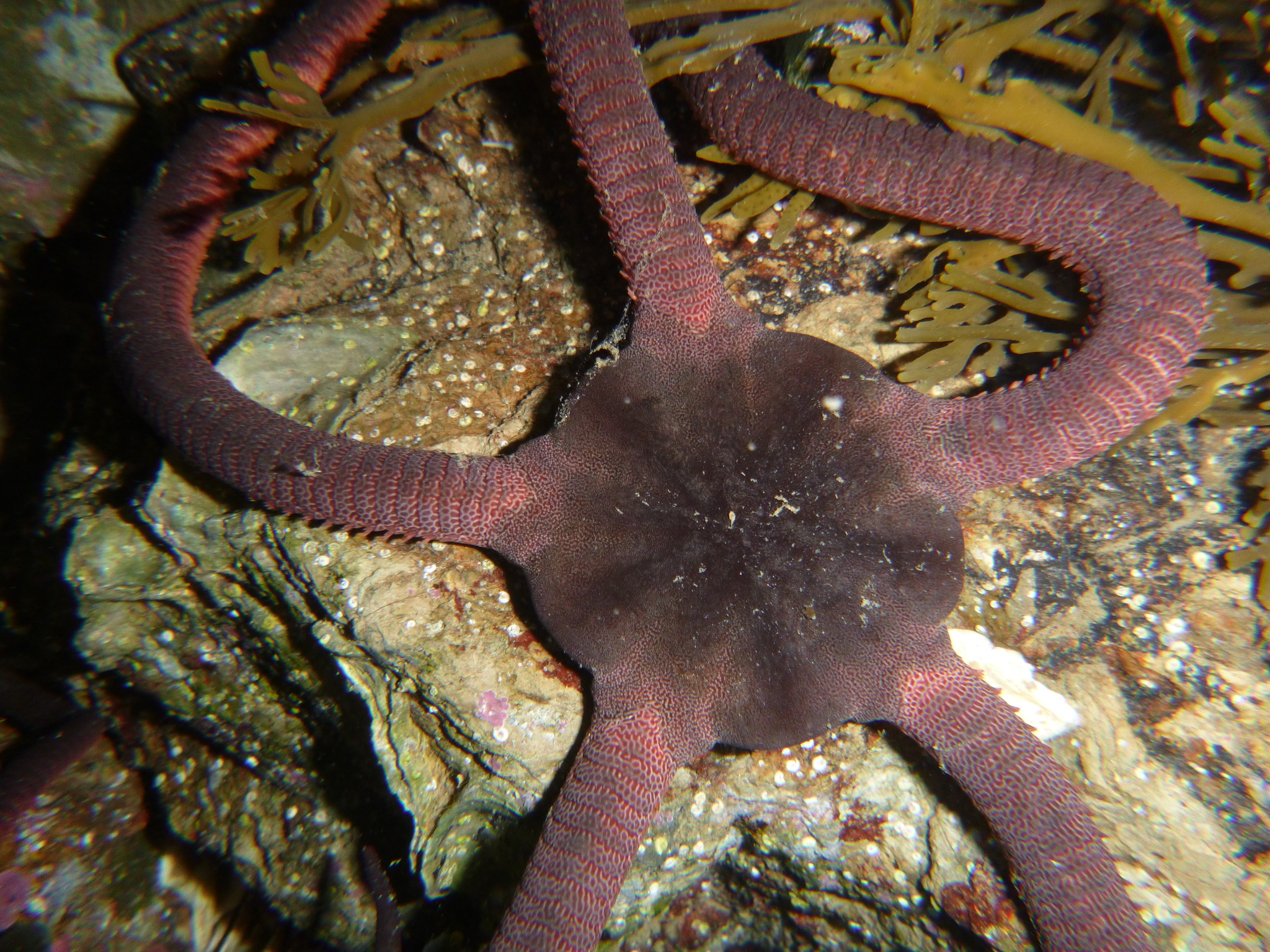
- Ophiopsammus maculata

Scientific classification
- Kingdom: Animalia
- Phylum: Echinodermata
- Class: Ophiuroidea
- Order: Ophiacanthida
- Family: Ophiodermatidae
- Genus: Ophiopsammus; Lütken, 1869

Type species
- Ophiopeza yoldii Lütken, 1856

= Ophiopsammus =

Genus of brittle stars

Ophiopsammus is a genus of brittle stars within the family Ophiodermatidae.

== Species ==
- Ophiopsammus aequalis (Lyman 1880)
- Ophiopsammus anchista (H. L. Clark 1911)
- Ophiopsammus angusta Vail & Rowe 1989
- Ophiopsammus assimilis (Bell 1888)
- Ophiopsammus maculata (Verrill 1869)
- Ophiopsammus yoldii (Lütken 1856)
