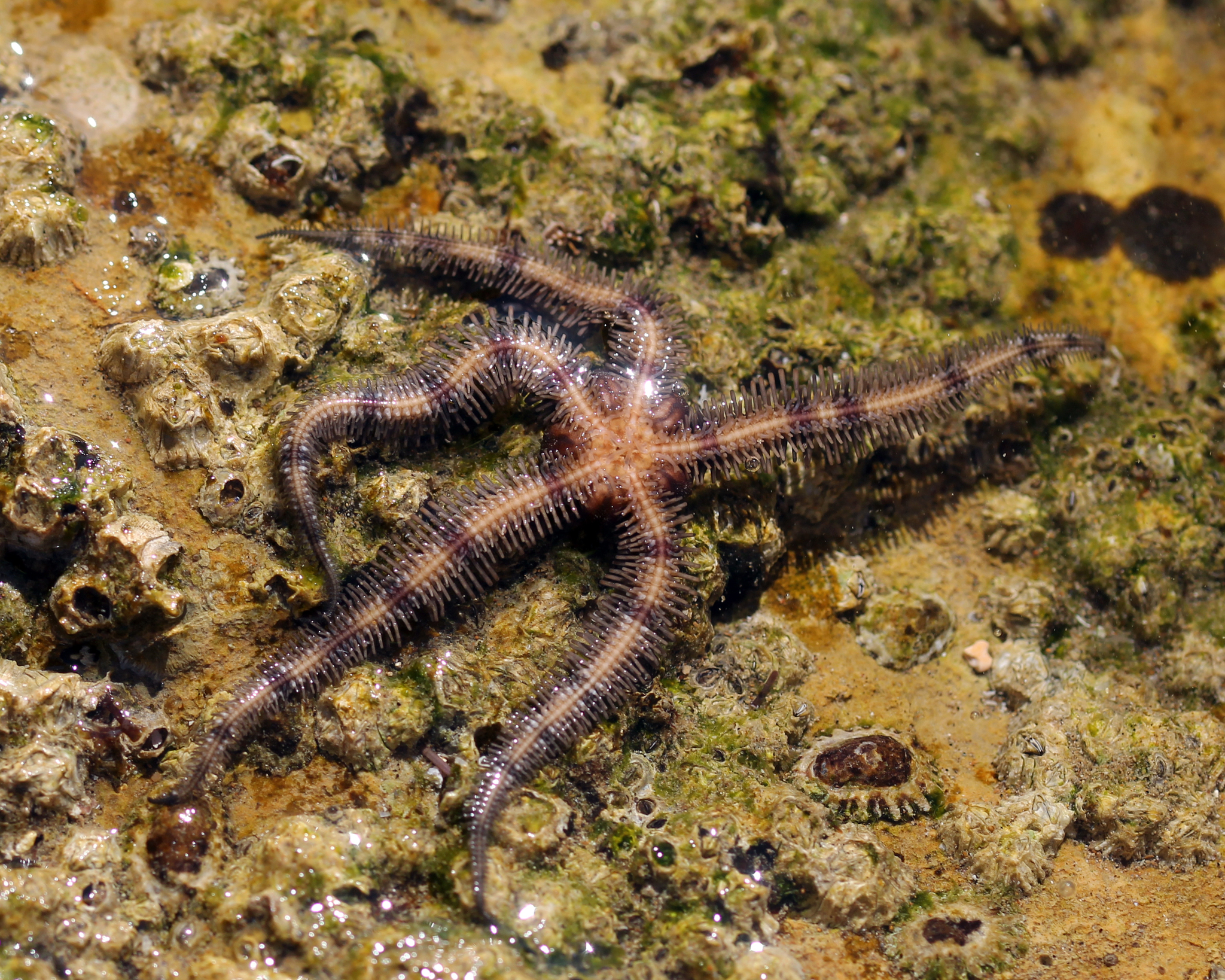
- Ophiopteris papillosa

Scientific classification
- Kingdom: Animalia
- Phylum: Echinodermata
- Class: Ophiuroidea
- Order: Ophiacanthida
- Family: Ophiopteridae; O'Hara, Stöhr, Hugall, Thuy & Martynov, 2018
- Genus: Ophiopteris; E. A. Smith, 1877

= Ophiopteris =

Genus of echinoderms

Ophiopteris is a genus of brittle stars. The genus was first described in 1877 from a specimen collected in New Zealand. It is the only genus in the family Ophiopteridae established in 2018.

Ophiopteris consists of two species with widely disjunct distributions, one from the waters around New Zealand and the other from the west coast of the United States. They both occur in shallow waters, to a maximum depth of 105–129 m (344–423 ft).

== Taxonomy ==
Ophiopteris contains the following species:

- Ophiopteris antipodum (E. A. Smith, 1877) – New Zealand
- Ophiopteris papillosa (Lyman, 1875) – west coast of the US

The phylogenetic tree of the family per O'Hara et al. (2017) is as follows.

- Ophiacanthida
  - - Ophiacanthina
      - - - - - Ophiacanthidae
              - Clarkcomidae
            - Ophiopteridae
          - Ophiotomidae
        - Ophiocamacidae
      - Ophiobyrsidae
  - Ophiodermatina
    - - Ophiodermatoidea
        - - Ophiomyxidae
          - Ophiopezidae
        - Ophiodermatidae
      - Ophiocomoidea
        Ophiocomidae
