= Eimeriorina =

Scientific classification
- Domain: Eukaryota
- Clade: Sar
- Clade: Alveolata
- Phylum: Apicomplexa
- Class: Conoidasida
- Order: Eucoccidiorida
- Suborder: Eimeriorina

Families and genera
- Aggregatidae; Aggregata; Angeiocystis; Grasseella; Merocystis; Ovivora; Pseudoklossia; Selysina; Steinina; Atoxoplasmatidae; Atoxoplasma; Barrouxiidae; Barrouxia; Crystallospora; Goussia; Calyptosporiidae; Calyptospora; Caryotrophidae; Caryotropha; Dorisiella; Cryptosporidiidae; Cryptosporidium; Eimeriidae; Alveocystis; Caryospora; Choleoeimeria; Cyclospora; Diaspora; Dorisa; Eimeria; Epieimeria; Gousseffia; Isospora; Margolisiella; Mantonella; Octosporella; Pfeifferinella; Polysporella; Sivatoshella; Skrjabinella; Tyzzeria; Wenyonella; Elleipsisomatidae; Elleipsisoma; Lankesterellidae; Lainsonia; Lankesterella; Schellackia; Sarcocystidae; Sarcocystinae; Cystoisospora; Frenkelia; Sarcocystis; Toxoplasmatinae; Besnoitia; Hammondia; Heydornia; Hyaloklossia; Neospora; Nephroisospora; Toxoplasma; Selenococcidiidae; Selenococcidium; Spirocystidae; Spirocystis; Unclassified; Hoarella; Pythonella

Suborder of single-celled organisms

Eimeriorina is a suborder of phylum Apicomplexa.

All species in this clade are homoxenous or facultatively homoxenous. Merogony, gamogony and oocyst formation all occur within the same host. The hosts may be vertebrates or invertebrates.

Erroneous identifications of species is a major problem in coccidian systematics and it is likely that some of the genera and species will be revised.

== Taxonomy ==
There are 12 families, 2 subfamilies and 50 genera recognised in this suborder.

The genus Eimeria with ~1500 species is the largest genus in this suborder.

== Notes ==
One genus is entirely entomogenous (parasitic on insects) — Barrouxia.

The taxonomic status of Atoxoplasma remains unclear.
