= Besnoitia bennetti =

Scientific classification
- Domain: Eukaryota
- Clade: Diaphoretickes
- Clade: SAR
- Clade: Alveolata
- Phylum: Apicomplexa
- Class: Conoidasida
- Order: Eucoccidiorida
- Family: Sarcocystidae
- Genus: Besnoitia
- Species: B. bennetti

Binomial name
- Besnoitia bennetti (Bennett, 1927) Babudieri, 1932

Species of single-celled organism

Besnoitia bennetti is a parasite that can cause besnoitiosis infections in donkeys. The range of this organism ranges from Africa to the United States. B. bennettii shares similar characteristics with Toxoplasma, Neospora, and Sarcocystis genera. Lab work on B. bennetti is conducted at biosafety level 1.

== Range ==
Besnoitia bennetti originated in Africa, causing besnoitiosis in donkeys and horses there. Currently, the organism exists in Sudan, South Africa, France, the Pyrenees, Mexico, and the United States. The first recorded infection of this species was documented in 1927 in Sudan. The species was believed to have spread from the Nuba Mountains. The first documented case in the United States occurred in 1957, when the species was found in the skin of burros.

== Pathogenesis ==
The instance of this species in a medical journal was in 1927, in an article written by S.C.J. Bennett. In an expedition to Sudan, Bennett found four horses that had developed cysts consistent with what was eventually called besnoitiosis. Bennett at first mistakenly believed that the infection he found was caused by species of Sarcocystis or Globidium and that the organism infected cattle in addition to horses. In 1932, the species was placed into the Besnoitia genus by Babudieri. The first instance of an infection in South Africa appeared in a medical journal in 1955. B. bennetti was discovered in the United States in 1973 in an experimental herd of Mexican burros.

== Diagnosis ==
In infected donkeys, B. bennetti formed cysts in the eyes, mouth, and testes. The mode of transmission among donkeys has not been determined. Treatments with ponazuril, trimethoprim-sulfamethoxazole, and nitroxinide have been unable to clear infection.

While B. bennetti has only been found to infect donkeys, it has experimentally been shown not to infect mice, rats, gerbils, or cats.
