= Spirocystis =

Scientific classification
- Domain: Eukaryota
- (unranked): SAR
- (unranked): Alveolata
- Phylum: Apicomplexa
- Class: Conoidasida
- Order: Eucoccidiorida
- Suborder: Eimeriorina
- Family: Spirocystidae
- Genus: Spirocystis

Species
- Spirocystis nidula

Genus of single-celled organisms

Spirocystis is a genus of parasites in the phylum Apicomplexa. The genus was described in 1911 by Léger and Duboscq.

The family Spirocystidae was created in 1915 by Leger & Duboscq in 1915 for this genus.

== Description ==
Species in this genus infect the blackworm (Lumbriculus variegatus). The asexual forms, crescentic or spiral shaped, may be found in virtually any tissue of the host.

The multinucleate vermicular meronts are ~35 μm in length and occur in the coelomic cavity and various tissues of the host.

The microgametocytes and macrogametes form in the intestinal epithelium. The microgametes are non-flagellated.

The zygote produces a thick walled oocysts ~35 μm in diameter.

The sporoblasts give rise to a single naked sporozoite with a length of up to 40 μm.
