= Hammondia hammondi =

Scientific classification
- Domain: Eukaryota
- Clade: Sar
- Clade: Alveolata
- Phylum: Apicomplexa
- Class: Conoidasida
- Order: Eucoccidiorida
- Family: Sarcocystidae
- Genus: Hammondia
- Species: H. hammondi

Binomial name
- Hammondia hammondi Frenkel & Dubey 1975

Species of Conoidasida in the apicomplex phylum

Hammondia hammondi is a species of obligate heteroxenous parasitic alveolates of domestic cats (final host). Intracellular cysts develop mainly in striated muscle. After the ingestion of cysts by cats, a multiplicative cycle precedes the development of gametocytes in the epithelium of the small intestine (each oocyst of the species averaging 11×13 μm). Oocyst shedding persists for 10 to 28 days followed by immunity. Cysts in skeletal muscle measure between 100 and 340 μm in length and 40 and 95 μm in width. Some of the intermediate hosts (e.g. guinea pigs, hamsters) develop low levels of antibody and some cross-immunity against Toxoplasma.

== Background ==
Hammondia hammondi is an apicomplexan parasite with cat as its definitive host. It was discovered in 1975 and named after the eminent protozoologist D. M. Hammond. The parasite is obligate intracellular by nature and closely resembles Toxoplasma gondii, another zoonotic parasite of cats. After bradyzoites (in tissue cysts) are ingested by cats, just like T. gondii, H. hammondi also multiplies both asexually and sexually in the intestines of cats and in about 1–3 days, stages of parasites can be found in sections of the cat's small intestine. Subsequently, oocysts are excreted in the faeces.

Relation to Toxoplasma gondii - very similar although H. hammondi has a smaller group of hosts that it can infect. This group is cats, rats, mice, other small rodents, goats, and roe deer. Mice were used to test the differences between T. gondii and H. hammondi, telling scientists that H. hammondi infections in mice can only be caused by oocysts and not the tachyzoites or bradyzoites. The different stages (tachyzoite, bradyzoites and sporozoites) are virtually indistinguishable from T. gondii under light microscopy.

Earlier, the validity of H. hammondi as a separate organism was under question. However, detailed studies have conclusively proved that H. hammondi is structurally, biologically, antigenically, and genetically distinct from T. gondii. Though they appear similar under light microscopy, under electron microscopy, there are two consistent differences between their tachyzoites and sporozoites. Rhoptries in H. hammondi tachyzoites are electron-dense whereas those of T. gondii tachyzoites are electron-lucent. The crystalloid body present in sporozoites of H. hammondi and other coccidia is absent in T. gondii. Unlike T. gondii, H. hammondi does not multiply 'luxuriously' in cell culture. Tissue cysts are formed within a few days of culture and the parasite is soon 'outgrown' by the host cells. With T. gondii, all stages can set up infection in both definite and intermediate hosts, whereas only the oocysts of H. hammondi are infective to mice and cats get patent infection only on consuming tissues containing the bradyzoite cysts.

Subsequent studies have clearly shown molecular differences between H. hammondi and T. gondii using the PCR (polymerase chain reaction). Primers can differentially diagnose the parasites even in a tissue sample with mixed infection of both parasites, which was not possible previously.

As an experiment, oocysts were given to eight dogs while cysts were given to four dogs. Between the period of 16–101 days, all of the experimented dogs died and did not shed oocysts. The intestines of the dogs were given to cats which then shed oocysts after 8–10 days. The scientists found out that there were no lesions in any of the twelve dogs that were given the parasite. Dogs, along with the other rodents, are intermediate hosts and cats are the final host. That means cats are don't experience the symptoms of the disease.

TA cat from Iowa was infected, along with a cat from Germany and three out of 1,604 cats from Hawaii. Over a thousand cats were killed by the Humane Society in Ohio and their feces were examined for intestinal issues. H. hammondi was discovered along with some other parasites. There was a wide range of the disease. In Australia, 1978, another scientist discovered feeding his laboratory-raised cats infected mice and rats. The result was the cats shed oocysts. In Japan, scientists discovered that feeding muscles from infected goats to cats lead to patent infections. The cat from Germany was fed roe deer muscles and shed oocysts, proving that there are many intermediate hosts and cats being the final host.
