= Jessica Kissinger =

American academic

Jessica Kissinger is a Distinguished Research Professor at the Franklin College of Arts and Sciences, University of Georgia and director of the Institute of Bioinformatics. Her research focus is on the evolution, assembly and data curation of protozoan parasite genomes, particularly Cryptosporidium, Toxoplasma gondii and Plasmodium.

== Biography ==
Kissinger obtained her PhD at Indiana University Bloomington in 1995. During her PostDoc she worked with David Roos to help establish the Eukaryotic Pathogen Database (EuPathDB) series of genome collections, including the malaria specific PlasmoDB, for easy querying and access by scientists. Since its launch in 1999 the database has accrued 9TB of data, has been received renewed grant contributions by the NIH at every funding cycle, and now receives 6 million searches a year from 13,000 individuals. Most recently Kissinger and Roos were awarded a grant that is expected to total US$23.4million for maintaining the resource. The success of EuPathDB has led to the creation of Clinical Epidemiology Database (ClinEpiDB) based on the same framework, alongside Christian Stoekert and Christiane Hertz-Fowler.

In 2008, while an associate professor, she was made a National Associate of the National Academies of Sciences, Engineering, and Medicine. She helped to establish the Institute of Bioinformatics at the University of Georgia and then became director. In 2016 she was awarded the Richard F. Reiff Internationalization Award by the University (alongside fellow professor Rose Chepyator-Thomson) for her international collaborations, opening up data internationally, and for being a member of the steering group for the West African International Centers of Excellence for Malaria Research at the National Institutes of Health.

Beyond the creation of databases, Kissinger focuses on the analysis and comparison of parasite genomes. Using genome assemblies from across the Apicomplexa (which includes malaria and toxoplasmosis parasites) it was shown that genetic synteny (genes arranged in the same groupings in different genomes) was substantially less than expected from animal genomes, suggesting that the parasite genomes have undergone major rearrangements or that their most recent common ancestor is more ancient than previously thought. In 2012 her lab helped develop a computational tool, MCScanX, to identify synteny across genomes, which has been cited >650 times.

Kissinger continues to make big data obtained from investigations into parasites as accessible as it can be. The Malaria Host-Pathogen Interaction Center, a collaboration with Emory University, funded by the National Institute of Allergy and Infectious Diseases and headed by Mary Galinski, is embarking on a major project to characterise many thousands of malaria-mammal associations and Kissinger is involved in converting this data into a format that can be used by everyone. She said of the project: "The goal of my team is to integrate the terabytes of data being produced on both the host and the parasite and make it accessible to our mathematical modelers, who are looking for patterns and signals, as well as the global malaria research community to guarantee that this large investment has the biggest impact possible on malaria research".
