= Elleipsisoma =

Scientific classification
- Domain: Eukaryota
- (unranked): SAR
- (unranked): Alveolata
- Phylum: Apicomplexa
- Class: Conoidasida
- Order: Eucoccidiorida
- Suborder: Eimeriorina
- Family: Elleipsisomatidae
- Genus: Elleipsisoma Franca, 1912

Species
- Elleipsisoma talpae Elleipsisoma thomsoni

Genus of single-celled organisms

Elleipsisoma is a genus of parasites within the phylum Apicomplexa.

== History ==
This parasite was described in 1912 by Franca. This genus may have been described earlier by Graham-Smith

The type species is Elleipsisoma thomsoni

== Hosts ==
This parasite infects the European mole (Talpa europaea). It is most commonly found in the heart and lungs. It may occasionally be found in the kidneys, liver and spleen.

== Geographical distribution ==
This parasite is found in the United Kingdom.

== Description ==
Parasitized red cells were larger than normal mature erythrocytes

Electron microscopic studies have shown the presence of rhoptries, micronemes, polar ring, microtubules and a conoid.

== Vectors ==
Possible vectors include the mites Eulaelaps stabularis, Haemogamasus hirsutus and Haemogamasus nidi.
