= Besnoitia tarandi =

Scientific classification
- Domain: Eukaryota
- Clade: Sar
- Superphylum: Alveolata
- Phylum: Apicomplexa
- Class: Conoidasida
- Order: Eucoccidiorida
- Family: Sarcocystidae
- Genus: Besnoitia
- Species: B. tarandi

Binomial name
- Besnoitia tarandi (Hadwen, 1922)

Synonyms
- Fibrocystis tarandi Hadwen, 1922

Species of single-celled organism

Besnoitia tarandi is a species of single-celled parasites that afflicts reindeer and causes besnoitiosis.

The Beltsville Agricultural Research Center, in collaboration with a Finnish university, studied Besnoitia tarandi tissue cysts from infected reindeer.

It has been reported in Canadian woodland caribou.
