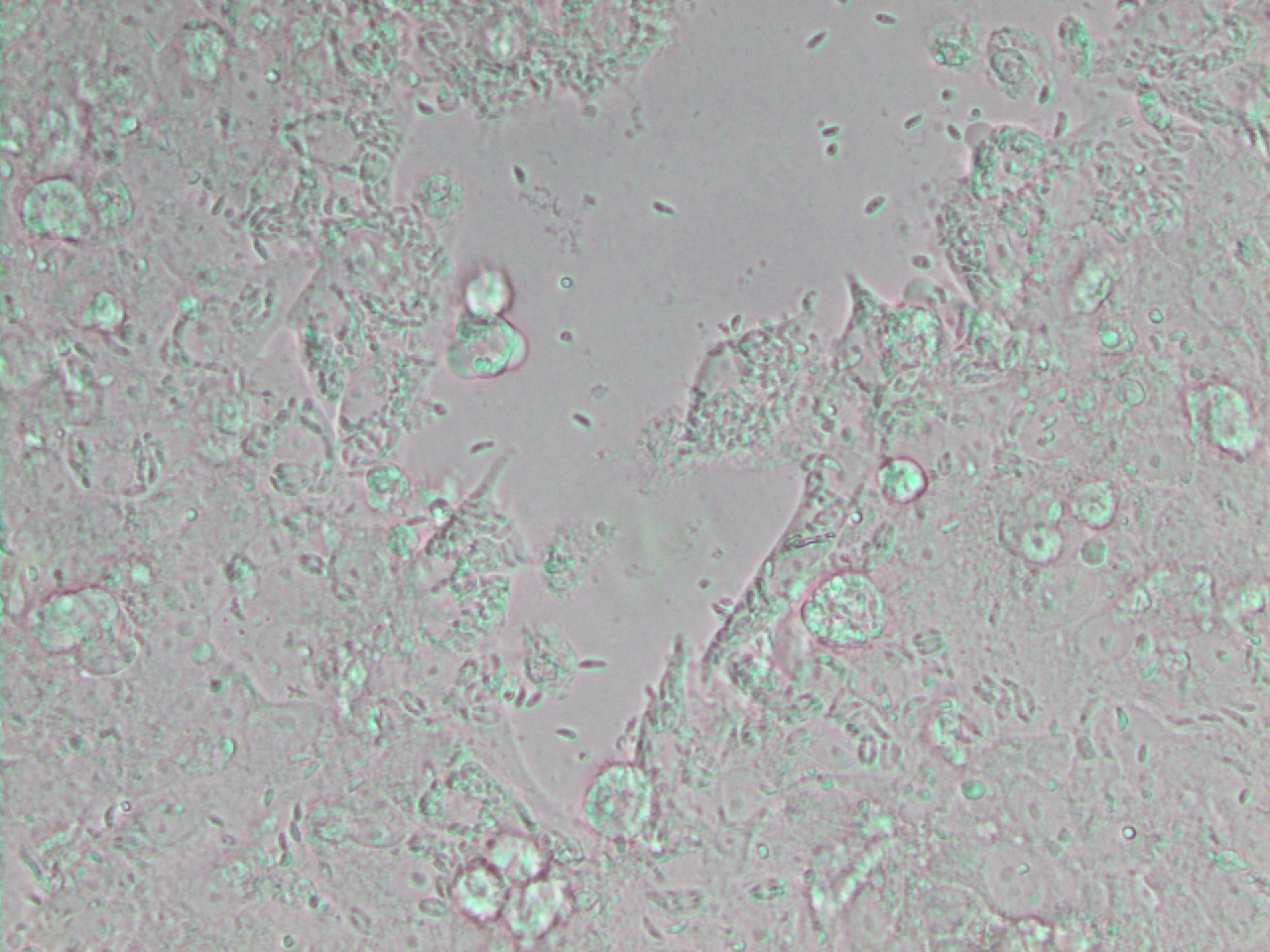
- Neospora caninum

Scientific classification
- Domain: Eukaryota
- Clade: Sar
- Clade: Alveolata
- Phylum: Apicomplexa
- Class: Conoidasida
- Order: Eucoccidiorida
- Family: Sarcocystidae
- Genus: Neospora
- Species: N. caninum

Binomial name
- Neospora caninum Dubey, Carpenter, speer, Topper & Uggla, 1988

= Neospora caninum =

Species of Conoidasida in the apicomplex phylum

Neospora caninum is a coccidian parasite that was identified as a species in 1988. Prior to this, it was misclassified as Toxoplasma gondii due to structural similarities. The genome sequence of Neospora caninum has been determined by the Wellcome Trust Sanger Institute and the University of Liverpool. Neospora caninum is an important cause of spontaneous abortion in infected livestock.

== Life cycle and transmission ==
Neospora caninum has a heteroxenous life cycle, with the sexually reproductive stage occurring in the intestine of a definitive host. Until 2004, the only known definitive host was the domestic dog. New research has determined that other canids such as coyotes (Canis latrans), gray wolves (Canis lupus), and Australian dingos (Canis lupus dingo) are also definitive hosts.

Oocysts passed in the feces of the definitive host, such as canines or canids, are ingested by an intermediate host, such as cattle. After ingestion of an oocyst, motile and rapidly dividing tachyzoites are released. These tachyzoites disseminate throughout the host, and in response to the host immune response, differentiate into bradyzoites, which form cysts in muscle and tissue. Formation of these cysts results in chronic infection of the intermediate host. Ingestion of infected intermediate host tissue by the definitive host completes the life cycle. A second route of transmission is the congenital transmission from mother to offspring. Transplacental transmission (passage from mother to offspring during pregnancy) has also been shown to occur in dogs, cats, sheep and cattle. If the intermediate host acquires the disease during pregnancy, it activates these cysts, and active infection often causes spontaneous abortion. In addition, if the aborted fetus and membranes are then eaten by the definitive host, they cause further infection and the cycle is complete. Other carnivores, for example the red fox (Vulpes vulpes), may also be intermediate hosts, but they are not known to be definitive hosts. Neospora caninum does not appear to be infectious to humans. In dogs, Neospora caninum can cause neurological signs, especially in congenitally infected puppies, where it can form cysts in the central nervous system.

The discovery that coyotes are definitive hosts may increase the risk of transmission of N. caninum to domestic livestock as well as to wild ruminants such as white-tailed deer (Odocoileus virginianus). Coyote range now includes most of North and Central America. Studies suggest that the parasite may be widespread among wildlife and that infection cycles cross over between wild and domestic animals.

From 2010, studies have broadened the list of known intermediate hosts to include birds. N. caninum has recently been found to infect domestic chickens and house sparrows (Passer domesticus) which may become infected after ingesting parasite oocysts from the soil. Sparrows, which are common in urban and rural areas, may serve as a food source for wild and domestic carnivores. N. caninum has also been detected in common buzzards (Buteo buteo) and magpies. The presence of birds in cattle pastures has been correlated to higher infection rates in cattle. Birds may be an important link in the transmission of N. caninum to other animals.

== Clinical disease ==
Neosporosis is an infectious disease for many different canids and cattle. Neuromuscular degeneration was first observed in canines in Norway, which led to hind limb paralysis. Abortion in dairy cattle was also observed as a major cause of disease by neosporosis. Although this disease is worldwide, it is of major concern in the United States, Netherlands, and New Zealand.

N. caninum infections have been reported from most parts of the world with studies in the United States, New Zealand, the Netherlands, Estonia, Germany, and Portugal. 12-45% of aborted fetuses from dairy cattle are infected with the organism. Exposure is common in US dairy herds, ranging from 16% to 36% of dairy cows testing positive on serum. The majority of calves that acquire a Neospora infection during gestation are born clinically normal except that they have precolostral antibody titers to Neospora caninum.

== Treatment and control ==
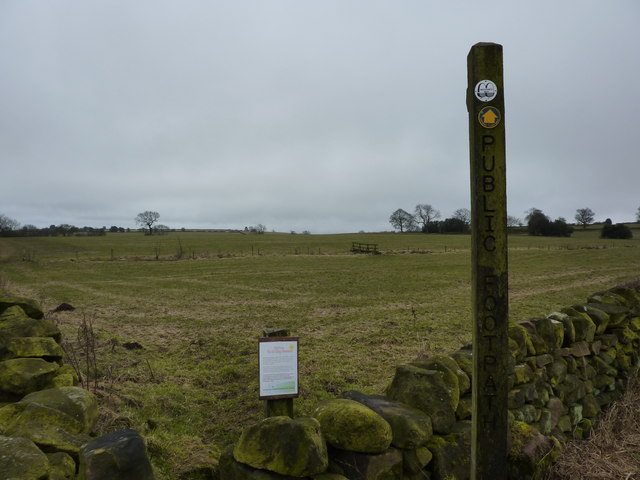
A notice at the entrance to the field reminds dog owners to keep their pets on leads, keep to the footpath and collect up all dog faeces. Pregnant cattle which eat hay made from grass in these fields have been aborting their calves due to a disease called neosporosis, caused by Neospora caninum. This type of abortion in young cows is very painful, and at present there is no vaccination.

In addition to being an important cause of cattle abortions, neosporosis is a significant disease in dogs throughout the world. If the disease is caught early, dogs may be successfully treated with clindamycin and other antiprotozoan drugs. However, the disease is often fatal to young puppies. Preventative vaccines have been tested on cattle. An inactivated vaccine was made commercially available but had mixed results. A live vaccine using attenuated N. caninum tachyzoites has been more successful but is expensive to produce. Other treatment options aim at prevention of the disease. Prevention requires an understanding of the transmission cycle, especially the connection between cattle and dogs (canids). Canids may pick up the parasite from eating infected material and spread the disease through contaminated feces. One control method is to test for the disease and remove infected cattle from the herd. Another method of control is preventing canids from entering the cattle holding area.

== Etymology and History ==
From the neo- (Latin, "new") + spora (Greek, "seed") and canis (Latin, "dog"), Neospora caninum is a sporozoan parasite that was first described in 1984.
