= Besnoitia besnoiti =

Scientific classification
- Domain: Eukaryota
- Clade: Sar
- Clade: Alveolata
- Phylum: Apicomplexa
- Class: Conoidasida
- Order: Eucoccidiorida
- Family: Sarcocystidae
- Genus: Besnoitia
- Species: B. besnoiti

Binomial name
- Besnoitia besnoiti (Franco and Borges, 1916)

Species of single-celled organism

Besnoitia besnoiti is an apicomplexan protozoan parasite, closely related to Toxoplasma gondii and Neospora caninum,. It is part of a larger genus Besnoiti affecting multiple animal species, but Besnoita besnoiti, can affect livestock. and more specifically cattle as intermediate host, although some specific antibodies have been found in roe deer and red deer.

The biological cycle of the parasite remains unknown, it is suggested however that a carnivore, or more specifically the red fox, might be the definitive host.

== Geographical area ==
The origin of the disease seems to be difficult to specify, as there has been little attention to it until the end of the 20th century. It seems to be endemic from south of Europe, or maybe sub-Saharan countries. The disease has spread rapidly in the beginning of the 21st century, expanding its range to multiple continents. In Europe, it did spread from the south to cases being detected in multiple more northern countries like Germany or Belgium.

== Pathology: bovine besnoitiosis ==
Besnoitia besnoiti is responsible for two sequential phases of disease: an acute phase, followed by a chronic phase. The acute phase can be lethal or lead to infertility or sterility of males. The symptoms range from fever, anorexia, depression, followed by vascular disorder. The chronic phase can cause a wide range of skin lesions. Unfortunately, no vaccines or therapeutic tools exist yet to halt its progress.

== Genetics ==
This species has roughly 8,500 genes spread out over 13 chromosomes.
