= Selysina =

Scientific classification
- Domain: Eukaryota
- Clade: Sar
- Superphylum: Alveolata
- Phylum: Apicomplexa
- Class: Conoidasida
- Order: Eucoccidiorida
- Suborder: Eimeriorina
- Family: Aggregatidae
- Genus: Selysina; Duboscq, 1917

Species
- Selysina duboscqi Selysina incerta Selysina perforans

Genus of single-celled organisms

Selysina is a genus in the phylum Apicomplexa.

== History ==
This genus was created by Duboscq in 1917.

== Taxonomy ==
There are three species recognised in this genus.
