= Centrocone =

Centrocones are sub-cellular structures involved in the cell division of apicomplexan parasites. Centrocones are a nuclear sub-compartment in parasites of Toxoplasma gondii that work in apposition with the centrosome to coordinate the budding process in mitosis. The centrocone concentrates and organizes various regulatory factors involved in the early stages of mitosis, including the ECR1 and TgCrk5 proteins. The membrane occupation and recognition nexus 1 (MORN1) protein is also contained in this structure and is linked to human diseases, though not much is yet known about the connection between the centrocone and the MORN1 protein.

Centrocones are located in the nuclear envelope and contain spindles that are used in mitosis. Chromosomes are contained within these spindles of the centrocone throughout the cell cycle.
