= Barrouxia =

Scientific classification
- Domain: Eukaryota
- Clade: Sar
- Clade: Alveolata
- Phylum: Apicomplexa
- Class: Conoidasida
- Order: Eucoccidiorida
- Suborder: Eimeriorina
- Family: Barrouxiidae
- Genus: Barrouxia; Schneider, 1885

Species
- Barrouxia alpina Barrouxia belostomatis Barrouxia bulini Barrouxia caudata Barrouxia labbei Barrouxia ornata Barrouxia schneideri Barrouxia scolopendris Barrouxia spiralis Barrouxia ventricosa

Genus of single-celled organisms

Barrouxia is a genus of parasitic alveolates belonging to the phylum Apicomplexa.

This genus was created by Schneider in 1885. The species in this genus infect invertebrates.

== Taxonomy ==
Currently there are 10 species recognised in this genus. The original spelling of this genus was Barroussia. This was changed in 1912 to Barrouxia but occasionally authors may use the older spelling.

The genus Echinospora was synonymised with Barrouxia by Levine in 1980.

== Life cycle ==
This species infects the gastrointestinal tract of insects.

The parasite infects the cells of the gut wall. The oocysts contain many sporocysts. The sporocysts are bivalved with a single longitudinal suture. Each sporocyst gives rise to a single sporozoite. The mechanism of infection is via the orofaecal route.

== Host records ==
- B. ventricosa - centipede (Lithobius hexodus)

== Notes ==
The genera Echinospora and Urobarrouxia are now regarded as a junior synonym of Barrouxia.
