= Agamococcidiorida =

Scientific classification
- Domain: Eukaryota
- Clade: Sar
- Clade: Alveolata
- Phylum: Apicomplexa
- Class: Conoidasida
- Subclass: Coccidia
- Order: Agamococcidiorida

Families and genera
- Gemmocystidae: Gemmocystis; Rhytidocystidae: Rhytidocystis

Order of single-celled organisms

Agamococcidiorida is an order within the subclass Coccidia of the phylum Apicomplexa. All members of this order are parasitic protozoa.

They are found in marine annelids.

== Taxonomy ==
Agamococcidiorida includes two families: Rhytidocystidae and Gemmocystidae. However, a recent study suggested they are not closely related, that the order is polyphyletic and should be restricted to include only Rhytidocystidae. The authors also grouped the revised Agamococcidiorida with order Pseudoklossiida in a new superorder Eococcidia.

== Life cycle ==
Both merogony and gametogony are absent in this order.

The oocysts contain sporocysts with two sporozoites each.
