= Pseudoklossia =

Scientific classification
- Domain: Eukaryota
- Clade: Sar
- Clade: Alveolata
- Phylum: Apicomplexa
- Class: Marosporida
- Family: Aggregatidae
- Genus: Pseudoklossia; Léger & Duboscq, 1915

Species
- Pseudoklossia chitonis Pseudoklossia glomerata Pseudoklossia haliotis Pseudoklossia kabatai Pseudoklossia microcosmi Pseudoklossia patellae Pseudoklossia pectinis Pseudoklossia pelseneeri Pseudoklossia semiluna Pseudoklossia tellinovum

Genus of Conoidasida in the apicomplex phylum

Pseudoklossia is a genus in the phylum Apicomplexa. Species in this genus infect marine molluscs, although one species (Pseudoklossia microcosmi) infects in an ascidian worm. The life cycle is heteroxenous (requires at least two hosts).

The species infecting molluscs tend to infect the renal tissue.

== History ==
This genus was created by Leger and Duboscq in 1915.

== Taxonomy ==
The type species is Pseudoklossia glomerata.

== Description ==
The oocysts have numerous sporocysts. Each sporocyst generally has 2 sporozoites.
