= Besnoitiosis =

Protozoan disease of animals

Besnoitiosis is a protozoan disease of the skin, subcutis, blood vessels, mucous membranes, and other tissues" of animals. It "is endemic in tropical and sub-tropical regions with high infection rate but low mortality"; however, it is rare in other regions.

The causative organisms of the cutaneous disease, and the affected animals include:

- Besnoitia besnoiti in cattle (swelling of the lymph nodes, subcutaneous swellings, diarrhea, abortion and infertility)
- Besnoitia bennetti in horses and donkeys (characterized by a widespread, serious dermatitis)
- Besnoitia jellisoni and B. wallacei in rodents
- Besnoitia tarandi in reindeer and caribou
- Besnoitia darlingi in lizards, opossums, and snakes
- Besnoitia sauriana in lizards
- Viscerotropic strains of B. besnoiti in African antelope
- An unidentified Besnoitia species in goats in Iran, New Zealand, and Kenya
