= Ovivora =

Scientific classification
- Domain: Eukaryota
- Clade: Diaphoretickes
- Clade: SAR
- Clade: Alveolata
- Phylum: Apicomplexa
- Class: Marosporida
- Family: Aggregatidae
- Genus: Ovivora; Mackinnon and Ray, 1937
- Species: O. thalassemae

Binomial name
- Ovivora thalassemae (Lankester, 1885) Mackinnon & Ray, 1937

Genus of single-celled organisms

Ovivora is a genus in the phylum Apicomplexa.

== History ==
This genus was created by Mackinnon and Ray in 1937.

This species was earlier described by Lankester and named Monocystis thalassemae.

== Taxonomy ==
There is one species recognised in this genus.

== Description ==
This species infects the eggs of the echiuroid worm (Thalassema neptuni). This occurs while the eggs are within the genital pouches (nephridial sacs).

Schizogony and sporogony both occur within the eggs.

The mature sexual parasites are vermiform and immobile. The males are smaller than the females. The microgametocyte, when it becomes spherical, gives rise to numerous, elongate microgametes. These are similar to those of Aggregata.

The oocysts have many sporocysts, each with up to 12 sporozoites.

The number of chromosomes appears to be seven.
