= Hyaloklossia =

Scientific classification
- Domain: Eukaryota
- Clade: Sar
- Clade: Alveolata
- Phylum: Apicomplexa
- Class: Conoidasida
- Order: Eucoccidiorida
- Family: Sarcocystidae
- Genus: Hyaloklossia

Species
- Hyaloklossia lieberkuehni Hyaloklossia kasumiensis

Genus of single-celled organisms

Hyaloklossia is a genus of parasitic alveolates in the phylum Apicomplexa. Only two species in this genus are currently recognised.

== History ==
Hyaloklossia lieberkuehni (type species) was first observed by Lieberkuhn in 1854 within the renal cortex of a frog of the genus Rana. Labbe in 1894 initially named this species Klossia lieberkuehni. Labbe in 1896 moved this species to a new genus Hyaloklossia.

Laveran and Mesnil in 1902 and Minchin in 1903 moved this species into the genus Diplospora Labbe 1893. It was moved again into the genus Isospora by Noller in 1923.

The species was replaced in the genus Hyaloklossia by Modry et al. in 2001.

== Description ==
There are two sporocysts within the oocysts. The oocysts have a thin, elastic, relatively fragile wall.

The sporocysts are tetrazoic. The sporocyst wall is composed of plates joined by sutures and Stieda and substieda bodies are absent.

The life cycle is homoxenous.

Endogenous development is extraintestinal (renal). Sporulation of oocysts is endogenous.

== Life cycle ==
The sporocysts are released from the renal epithelial cells and are passed with the urine into the water.

It is presumed that they are subsequently ingested, decyst within the gut, invade the gut wall and migrate to the renal cortex.

The parasites grow with the renal epithelial cells and give rise to male and female gamonts which are released into the lumen of the tubule where they meet and fuse forming an oocyte. The oocyte subsequently develops into an oocyst which in turn divides into two sporocysts.

== List of species and hosts ==
- Hyaloklossia lieberkuehni

- European green frog (Rana kl. esculentus)

- Yellow-bellied toad (Bombina variegata)

- Hyaloklossia kasumiensis

- Tokyo daruma pond frog (Pelophylax porosus porosus)

- Nagoya daruma pond frog (Pelophylax porosus brevipodus)

- Black-spotted pond frog (Pelophylax nigromaculatus)

- Hyaloklossia sp.

- Northern leopard frog (Lithobates pipiens)
