= Calyptospora =

Scientific classification
- Domain: Eukaryota
- Clade: Sar
- Clade: Alveolata
- Phylum: Apicomplexa
- Class: Conoidasida
- Order: Eucoccidiorida
- Suborder: Eimeriorina
- Family: Calyptosporiidae
- Genus: Calyptospora

Species
- Calyptospora empristica Calyptospora funduli Calyptospora goeppertiana Calyptospora jiinduli Calyptospora serrasalmi Calyptospora spinosa Calyptospora tucunarensis

Genus of single-celled organisms

Calyptospora is a genus of parasitic protozoa in the phylum Apicomplexa.

This genus and family was created in 1984 for the species Eimeria funduli because of morphological differences in the sporocyst suggested that it was not a typical member of the genus Eimeria.

The type species is Calyptospora funduli.

== Life cycle ==
These parasites infect the livers of their fish hosts which they appear to reach via the gastrointestinal tract.

They have an obligatory intermediate host - usually a shrimp - in which they infect the enterocytes of the shrimp gut.

The life cycle appears to be as follows: infected fish excrete the parasites from their gastrointestinal tract into which they are secreted with the bile. An intermediate host such as a shrimp ingests the parasite which then decysts and infects the gut wall of the shrimp. The shrimp is then ingested by a fish whereupon the parasite is released and invades the fish's gut wall. The parasites then travel via the blood stream to the liver wherein they mature.

== Description ==
The sporocyst lacks Stieda bodies and sub-Stieda bodies, has a veil supported by sporopodia and has an anterior apical opening. A suture may be present but if present it does not completely divide the sporocyst into two valves.

== Phylogenetics ==
This clade appears to be monophyletic and a sister group to the genus Eimeria.
