= Heydornia =

Scientific classification
- Domain: Eukaryota
- Supergroup: Alveolata
- Phylum: Apicomplexa
- Class: Conoidasida
- Order: Eucoccidiorida
- Family: Sarcocystidae
- Subfamily: Toxoplasmatinae
- Genus: Heydornia

Species
- Heydornia heydorni Heydornia triffittae

Genus of parasitic protist in the apicomplexan phylum

Heydornia is a genus of parasitic alveolates in the phylum Apicomplexa.

== History ==
This genus was created in 2016 by splitting canid-infecting species from Hammondia based on the molecular phylogenetic analysis.

== Life cycle ==
The species in this genus have two vertebrate hosts in their life cycle: a canid (the definitive host) and prey species (the intermediate host). They are strictly heteroxenous.
