= Frenkelia =

Scientific classification
- Domain: Eukaryota
- Clade: Sar
- Clade: Alveolata
- Phylum: Apicomplexa
- Class: Conoidasida
- Order: Eucoccidiorida
- Family: Sarcocystidae
- Subfamily: Sarcocystinae
- Genus: Frenkelia; Biocca, 1968

Species
- Frenkelia clethrionomyobuteonis Frenkelia glareoli Frenkelia microti

Genus of single-celled organisms

Frenkelia is a genus of parasites in the phylum Apicomplexa. The species in this genus infect the gastrointestinal tracts of birds of prey (definitive hosts) and the tissues of small rodents (intermediate hosts).

== Taxonomy ==
Species of this genus share antigens with Sarcocystis. DNA studies suggest that this genus should be merged with Sarcocystis.

Despite several recommendations, abolition of this genus has not yet been approved.

== Lifecycle ==
The parasites undergo sexual reproduction in the gut of the definitive host — a bird of prey. They form cysts and are then eaten by a small rodent. Within the gut of the rodent, the parasites decyst. They invade the intestinal wall and are carried to the liver. They undergo schizogony in the hepatocytes and Kupffer cells. They then invade the nervous tissue of the rodent host, forming cystic structures. The infected rodent is then eaten by a bird, when the tissue cysts are digested, releasing the parasites. The parasites invade the enterocytes, undergo merogony and gametogony. Gametes are formed which then fuse forming a zygote that undergoes encystation.

== Host records ==
- Frenkelia microti — red tailed hawk (Buteo jamaicensis), chinchilla (Chinchilla lanigera), prairie voles (Microtus ochrogaster)

=== Unknown parasite species ===
- Field mouse (Apodemus flavicollis)
- Water vole (Arvicola sapidus)
- Red-tailed hawks (Buteo borealis)
- Red-backed vole (Clethrionomys rufocanus)
- Porcupine (Erethizon dorsatum)
- Muskrat (Ondatra zibethica)
- Northern spotted owl (Strix occidentalis caurina)
