= Besnoitia =

Scientific classification
- Domain: Eukaryota
- Clade: Sar
- Clade: Alveolata
- Phylum: Apicomplexa
- Class: Conoidasida
- Order: Eucoccidiorida
- Family: Sarcocystidae
- Genus: Besnoitia

Species
- Besnoitia akodoni; Besnoitia bennetti; Besnoitia besnoiti; Besnoitia caprae; Besnoitia darlingi; Besnoitia jellisoni; Besnoitia neotomofelis; Besnoitia oryctofelisi; Besnoitia tarandi

Genus of single-celled organisms

Besnoitia is a genus of apicomplexan parasites.

== Life cycle ==
The life cycle of many of the species in this genus are not known. The life cycle may be complex with various intermediate hosts and vectors including Stomoxys and Tabanidae.

== Pathology and effects on the host ==
Infection with these parasites causes pedunculated lesions in the skin, nasal cavity and larynx of domestic animals. The lesions consist of exophytic nodules protruding from mucosal surfaces.

== See also ==
- Besnoitiosis
