= Gemmocystis =

Scientific classification
- Domain: Eukaryota
- Clade: Sar
- Clade: Alveolata
- Phylum: Apicomplexa
- Class: Conoidasida
- Subclass: Coccidia
- Family: Gemmocystidae; Upton & Peters 1986
- Genus: Gemmocystis; Upton & Peters 1986
- Species: G. cylindrus

Binomial name
- Gemmocystis cylindrus Upton & Peters 1986

Genus of single-celled organisms

Gemmocystis is a genus of apicomplexans.

This genus is parasitic on scleractinian corals (Agaricia agaricites, Dendrogyra cylindrus, Diploria strigosa, Meandrina meandrites, Montastraea cavernosa, Porites astreoides, Porites porites) and is found in the Caribbean. Very little is known about the species in this genus.

Gemmocystis cylindrus was isolated from within the gastrodermal cells of the mesenterial filaments of the coral. Only the oocysts and released sporozoites have been described. The parasites were isolated from bleached coral but their role if any in this sign is not known.

== Taxonomy ==
There is only one species known in this genus.
