= Hammondia =

Scientific classification
- Domain: Eukaryota
- Clade: Sar
- Superphylum: Alveolata
- Phylum: Apicomplexa
- Class: Conoidasida
- Order: Eucoccidiorida
- Family: Sarcocystidae
- Subfamily: Toxoplasmatinae
- Genus: Hammondia; Frenkel, 1974

Species
- Hammondia hammondi Hammondia pardalis

Genus of single-celled organisms

Hammondia is a genus of parasitic alveolates in the phylum Apicomplexa.

== History ==
This genus was created in 1975. Before this date the species of this genus were confused with Toxoplasma gondii to which they are closely related.

The canid-infecting species, H. heydorni and H. triffittae, have been split into new genus Heydornia based on the molecular phylogenetic analysis.

== Life cycle ==
The species in this genus have two vertebrate hosts in their life cycle: a felid (the definitive host) and prey species (the intermediate host), which vary and depend on the local fauna but include mice, deer and others.

In the gastrointestinal tract of the definitive host the parasite undergoes sexual reproduction, forms a zygote which after some divisions forms a cyst that is excreted. The cyst is subsequently ingested by the prey species in whom the parasite decysts and invades its tissues wherein it again multiplies and encysts. After ingestion of the tissues of the prey species by the definitive host the parasite again decysts and multiplies. It also undergoes sexual reproduction before encysting again.

== Genome ==
The genome of Hammondia hammondi has been sequenced.
