= Mary Galinski =

- Education: Sackler Institute of Biomedical Sciences, New York University School of Medicine
- Scientific career
- Workplaces: Emory University School of Medicine; New York University School of Medicine

Mary R. Galinski is a professor of medicine at the Emory Vaccine Center, Hubert Department of Global Health of the Rollins School of Public Health, and the Department of Medicine of the Emory University School of Medicine.

== Education and career ==
Galinski obtained her Ph.D. in molecular parasitology from Sackler Institute of Biomedical Sciences of the New York University School of Medicine at which she later served as faculty member of its Department of Medical and Molecular Parasitology before joining Emory University School of Medicine in 1998. In 1999, she joined Yerkes National Primate Research Center of the Emory Vaccine Center and prior to any positions, in 1992, as an assistant professor, she founded Malaria Foundation International the mission of which was to begin development and search for solutions to the health, economic and social problems caused by malaria.

== Research ==
In 2006, Galinski, Alberto Moreno, and Esmeralda Meyer established Emory's International Center for Malaria Research, Education, and Development (ICMRED), with founding members from Brazil, China, Colombia, India, Vietnam, and a number of African countries. In 2012, Galinski worked with Jessica Kissinger of the University of Georgia and was a founder of Georgian consortium. The same year, with the funding from the National Institute of Allergy and Infectious Diseases, she established the Malaria Host-Pathogen Interaction Center. In 2014, Galinski spoke at the University of Georgia's ninth annual Voices from the Vanguard.

In 2016, with a grant from DARPA, Galinski's research team from Emory University School of Medicine have collaborated with scientists from the Georgia Institute of Technology and the University of Georgia to develop a vaccine to cure malaria.

== Selected publications ==
- Carlton, Jane M., et al. (2008) "Comparative genomics of the neglected human malaria parasite Plasmodium vivax." Nature 455(7214): 757.
- Mueller, Ivo, et al. (2009) "Key gaps in the knowledge of Plasmodium vivax, a neglected human malaria parasite." The Lancet infectious diseases 9(9): 555–566.
- Galinski, Mary R., et al. (1992) "A reticulocyte-binding protein complex of Plasmodium vivax merozoites." Cell 69(7): 1213–1226.
- Pain, A., et al. (2008) "The genome of the simian and human malaria parasite Plasmodium knowlesi." Nature 455(7214): 799.
