= Terasterna =

Scientific classification
- Kingdom: Animalia
- Phylum: Arthropoda
- Subphylum: Chelicerata
- Class: Arachnida
- Order: Mesostigmata
- Family: Haemogamasidae
- Genus: Terasterna; Zhou, Gu & Wen, 1995

Genus of mites

Terasterna is a genus of mites in the family Haemogamasidae.

== Species ==
- Terasterna emeiensis (Zhou, 1981)
- Terasterna gongshenensis (Tian & Gu, 1989)
- Terasterna nanpingensis (Zhou, Chen & Wen, 1982)
- Terasterna parascaptoris (Wang & Li, 1965)
- Terasterna yunlongensis (Gu & Fang, 1987)
