= Ischyropoda =

Scientific classification
- Kingdom: Animalia
- Phylum: Arthropoda
- Subphylum: Chelicerata
- Class: Arachnida
- Order: Mesostigmata
- Family: Haemogamasidae
- Genus: Ischyropoda; Keegan, 1951

Genus of mites

Ischyropoda is a genus of mites in the family Haemogamasidae. There are three known species of Ischyropoda, all of which are found in the desert regions of North America.

== Species ==
These three species belong to the genus Ischyropoda:

- Ischyropoda spiniger Keegan, 1951
- Ischyropoda furmani Keegan, 1955
- Ischyropoda armatus Keegan, 1951

=== Ischyropoda spiniger ===
Ischyropoda spiniger is a species of mite in the genus Ischyropoda. This species uses the spiny pocket mouse of Baja California and Arizona as a host.

=== Ischyropoda furmani ===
Ischyropoda furmani is a species of mite in the genus Ischyropoda found in Utah. The species is characterized by its stout body, a small round dorsal shield and its spur like setae.

=== Ischyropoda armatus ===
Ischyropoda armatus is a species of mite in the genus Ischyropoda found across the Southwestern United States. The species is known to infest grasshopper mice, with as many as sixty-five individuals being found living on one host.
