= Margolisiella =

Scientific classification
- Domain: Eukaryota
- Clade: Sar
- Superphylum: Alveolata
- Phylum: Apicomplexa
- Class: Marosporida
- Genus: Margolisiella

Species
- Margolisiella chitonis; Margolisiella haliotis; Margolisiella islandica; Margolisiella kabatai; Margolisiella patellae; Margolisiella tellinovum

Genus of single-celled organisms

Margolisiella is a genus of parasitic alveolates belonging to the phylum Apicomplexa.

== History ==
This genus was created in 1997 by Desser and Bower for a group of protozoa that infect little neck clams (Protothaca staminea). The genus is named after Leo Margolis, a marine biologist.

Four species were transferred from the genus Pseudoklossia to Margolisiella: Margolisiella chitonis, Margolisiella haliotis, Margolisiella patellae and Margolisiella tellinovum.

== Taxonomy ==
There are six species currently recognised in this genus.

== Description ==
These are monoxenous parasites of marine bivalve molluscs. They infect primarily the renal epithelium. Merogony, sporogony and gametogony occur in the same host. Sporulation also occurs in the same host. The oocysts are large with numerous sporocytes. The sporocytes have 2-4 sporozoites each.

== Life cycle ==
Very little is known about the life cycle. The parasites are presumably ingested via the oral route and excreted in from the renal tract.

== Host records ==
- M. islandica - Iceland scallops (Chlamys islandica)
- M. kabatai - littleneck clam (Protothaca staminea)
