= Nephroisospora =

Scientific classification
- Domain: Eukaryota
- Clade: Sar
- Superphylum: Alveolata
- Phylum: Apicomplexa
- Class: Conoidasida
- Order: Eucoccidiorida
- Family: Sarcocystidae
- Genus: Nephroisospora; Wünschmann et al., 2010
- Species: N. eptesici

Binomial name
- Nephroisospora eptesici Wünschmann et al., 2010

Genus of single-celled organisms

Nephroisospora is a genus of parasites that infects bats

== History ==
This genus was described in 2010 by Wünschmann et al.

== Taxonomy ==
There is one recognised species in this genus — Nephroisospora eptesici.

== Description ==
This genus infects the kidneys of brown bats (Eptesicus fuscus).

The host reaction is usually generally mild, focal or multifocal and consists of well demarcated cortical renal lesion less than 1 millimeter in diameter. Histologically these lesions are cystic, dilated tubules with hypertrophied tubular epithelial cells.

The protozoa develop in the tubular epithelial cells and within the lumen of the cysts that develop as a response to infection. The oocysts are thin walled, sporulated and ellipsoidal measuring an average of 18.9 x 20.8 micrometers. Each oocysts contains 2 sporocysts with 4 sporozoites. The oocysts have a polar body and a prominent residuum but lack micropyles, sporocyst residua or Stieda bodies.
