= Euhaemogamasus =

Scientific classification
- Kingdom: Animalia
- Phylum: Arthropoda
- Subphylum: Chelicerata
- Class: Arachnida
- Order: Mesostigmata
- Family: Haemogamasidae
- Genus: Euhaemogamasus; Ewing, 1933

Genus of mites

Euhaemogamasus is a genus of mites in the family Haemogamasidae.

== Species ==
- Euhaemogamasus onychomydis Ewing, 1933
