= Selenococcidium =

Scientific classification
- Domain: Eukaryota
- (unranked): SAR
- (unranked): Alveolata
- Phylum: Apicomplexa
- Class: Conoidasida
- Order: Eucoccidiorida
- Suborder: Eimeriorina
- Family: Selenococcidiidae
- Genus: Selenococcidium

Species
- Selenococcidium intermedium

Genus of single-celled organisms

Selenococcidium is a genus of parasitic alveolates in the phylum Apicomplexa. There is one recognised species in this genus – Selenococcidium intermedium. This species infects the intestinal tract of European lobsters (Homarus gammarus).

The genus and species were described by Léger & Duboscq in 1909.

The specific name is derived from the appearance of the trophozoites which possesses aspects of both the coccidia and gregarines.

== Description ==
The mechanism by which the parasites enter the gastrointestinal tract of the lobster is not known this stage may (or may not) involve an intermediate host. Within the lobster the trophozoites are vermicular in form similar those of the gregarines. These enter an enterocyte, divide three times to give rise to an octonucleate schizont. The schizont divides and gives rise to eight merozoites which then invade other enterocytes. There may be several rounds of asexual reproduction.

At some point smaller merozoites are formed. These are of two sizes one smaller than the other. The smaller merozoites invade the enterocytes, and become octoploid. These then divide and give rise to eight vermicular microgameocytes. These gametocytes invade enterocytes and there undergo multiple divisions which are released into the lumen as microgametes.

The larger merozoites divide within the lumen of the gut twice giving rise to a four nucleated schizont. The schizont divides into four macrogametocytes which then invade the cells of the gut wall where they mature into macrogametes. Fertilization occurs and a zygote is formed.

Sporogony does not appear to occur in this genus.
