= Morn repeat containing 1 =

Protein found in humans

MORN1

Identifiers
- Aliases: MORN1, Morn repeat containing 1
- External IDs: MGI: 1924116; GeneCards: MORN1

Gene location (Human)
Chr.	Chromosome 1 (human)
Band	1p36.32	Start	2,321,253 bp
Band	1p36.32	End	2,391,707 bp

Gene location (Mouse)
Chr.	Chromosome 4 (mouse)
Band	4|4 E2	Start	155,086,577 bp
Band	4|4 E2	End	155,145,505 bp
RNA expression pattern
Bgee	Human / Mouse (ortholog); Top expressed in: right uterine tube; right hemisphere of cerebellum; tendon of biceps brachii; olfactory zone of nasal mucosa; sural nerve; left lobe of thyroid gland; right lobe of thyroid gland; left testis; right testis; anterior pituitary / Top expressed in: Epithelium of choroid plexus; otolith organ; utricle; neural layer of retina; spermatocyte; seminiferous tubule; spermatid; visual cortex; right kidney; granulocyte; More reference expression data
BioGPS	n/a
Orthologs
Databases	NCBI: entry; OMA: entry
Species	Human	Mouse
Entrez	79906	76866
Ensembl	ENSG00000116151	ENSMUSG00000029049
UniProt	Q5T089	n/a
RefSeq (mRNA)	NM_001301060; NM_024848	NM_001081100; NM_001356327
RefSeq (protein)	NP_001287989; NP_079124	n/a
Location (UCSC)	Chr 1: 2.32 – 2.39 Mb	Chr 4: 155.09 – 155.15 Mb
PubMed search
- Wikidata
View/Edit Human	View/Edit Mouse

MORN repeat-containing protein 1 (MORN1) is a protein that in humans is encoded by the MORN1 gene.

The function of MORN1 is not yet well understood. Orthologs have been found in eukaryotes and bacteria.

== Gene ==
The MORN1 gene is located on chromosome 1 at locus 1p36.33 and contains 7 MORN repeats. It has 1641 base pairs in 14 exons in the reference sequence mRNA transcript.

MORN1 is nearby the SKI gene which encodes the SKI protein, LOC100129534, and RER1 gene on the positive strand of chromosome 1. On the minus strand, the PEX10 gene occurs further upstream of Morn1.

=== Alternative splicing ===
MORN1 contains 19 different GT-AG introns, and 15 different mRNAs; 11 of which are produced by alternative splicing and 4 of which are unspliced. Of these variants there are 4 probable alternative promoters, 9 non-overlapping alternative last exons and 6 alternative polyadenylation sites. 753 bps of this gene are antisense (on + strand) to spliced SKI gene, and 193 bps to RER1 which may contribute to regulation of expression of itself or of its flanking genes.

== Protein ==
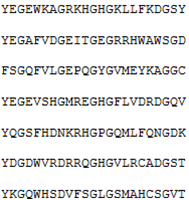
There are 7 consecutive MORN repeats in the Morn1 protein.

The MORN1 gene encodes a protein of 497 amino acids and contains two overlapping conserved protein domains. The first is the MORN repeat region in which the protein contains 7 MORN repeats (at residues 38-211) belonging to protein family: pfam02493. The second is a multidomain uncharacterized protein conserved in bacteria: COG4642 which contains the MORN repeat region plus the beginning target sequence (1–211). The other 286 amino acids are less conserved among orthologs (especially distant orthologs) and belong to no known protein family.

The unmodified protein is predicted to have a molecular weight of 53,835.05 daltons and an isoelectric point of 6.673. The protein has no long hydrophobic regions, suggesting it is not a transmembrane protein. It has been predicted to be localized in the cytoplasm, the nucleus or mitochondrial.

The genomic context may not necessarily infer function, but Morn1 has been predicted to contain a second peroxisomal targeting signal using PSORTII at residues 451: RLPPAFKHL, which may suggest interaction with PEX10 (see genomic context above).

Morn1 was also predicted to contain a nuclear export signal near the end of the protein at amino-acids LELH 334–338 (non-MORN repeat-containing region).

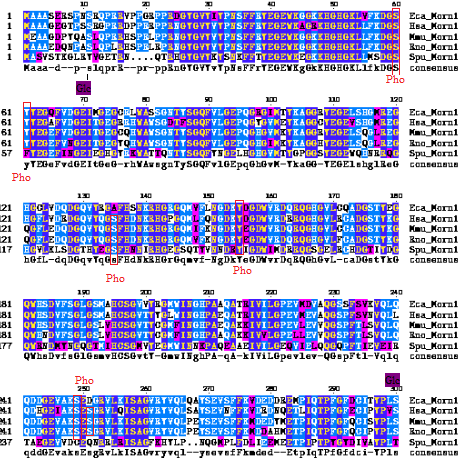
Predicted Phosphorylation (Pho)and Glycosylation(Glc) sites

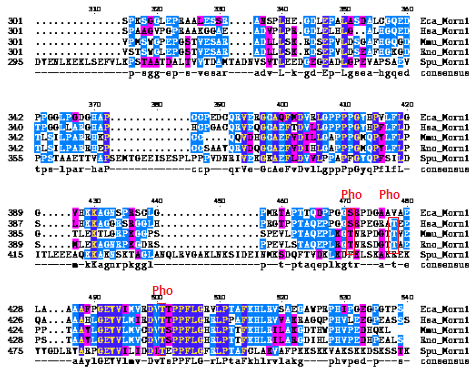
Listed top to bottom: Horse, Human, Mouse, Rat and Sea Urchin

=== Post-translational modification ===
Morn1 was predicted to have several glycosylation sites at the Serine 488 and at Threonine residues. There were also conserved Serine, Tyrosine and Threonine residues that were predicted phosphorylation sites that were conserved among orthologs. See image of the Multiple Sequence alignment and Texshade.

=== MORN ===
The Membrane Occupation and Recognition Nexus is a repeat that is found in multiple copies in several proteins including junctophilins. A MORN-repeat protein has been identified in the parasite Toxoplasma gondii and other apicomplexan protists.

In T. gondii, MORN1 plays role in nuclear division and daughter cell budding. It is specifically associated with the spindle poles, the anterior and interior rings of the inner membrane complex during asexual reproduction/sexual reproduction; budding; and schizogony (see Apicomplexan cellular morphology).

Over-expression of MORN1 resulted in specific, severe defects in nuclear segregation and daughter cell formation. It was hypothesized that "Morn1 functions as a linker protein between certain membrane regions and the parasite's cytoskeleton." The Morn repeats are not identical, but follow a general pattern of beginning with a YeG sequence, and specifically the subsequent glycine residues are well conserved even within microbial orthologs which may suggest that the glycine residues may be important and/or involved in some structural function of the protein.

== Tissue distribution ==
Expressed Sequence Tag and microarray data suggests that Morn1 is expressed predominantly in the brain, eyes, lungs, parathyroid, salivary gland, testis, kidneys, trachea, and to a lesser extent the ovaries, prostate, thymus and the trachea. It is expressed in adults and in fetuses. By health state, Morn1 appears to be expressed in the normal state, as well as germ cell and kidney tumors.

== Orthologs ==
The orthologs of the Morn1 protein are listed below obtained by BLAST analysis. The conservation of this protein is conserved in mammals and invertebrates. Reptiles, insects and birds do not seem to show much conservation of this protein while bacteria and protists show similar conservation as in birds and reptiles, but these organisms are much more evolutionarily distant from humans.

Organism	Accession number	% Identity to Human Gene
Equus caballus	XP_001495156	74
Mus musculus	NP_001074569	69
Canis familiaris	XP_849172	69
Rattus norvegicus	NP_001005544	66
Branchiostoma floridae	XP_002590560.1	58
Strongylocentrotus purpuratus	XP_793509.1	58
Trichoplax adhaerens	XP_002113780.1	50
Chlamydomonas reinhardtii	XP_001699198.1	45
Xenopus laevis	NP_001088789	41
Toxoplasma gondii	XP_002364290	36
Taeniopygia guttata	XP_002192069	35
Gallus gallus	XP_416745	33
Drosophila virilis	XP_002048955.1	29
Caenorhabditis elegans	NP_492193.2	22

== Structure similarity ==
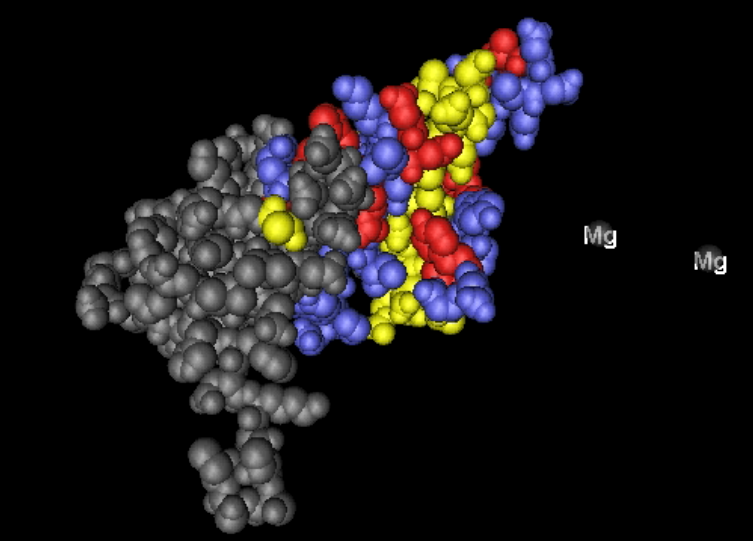
The red molecules are identical residues with Morn1, the yellow are conserved molecules within a MORN repeat and the blue and gray molecules are those with little to no similarity.

Based on C-blast results Morn1 has a sequence similarity to that of Chain A, of histone methyltransferase Set79. Morn1 aligns with 77 amino acids of this chain from residues 81–158.
