= Atoxoplasma =

Scientific classification
- Domain: Eukaryota
- Clade: Sar
- Clade: Alveolata
- Phylum: Apicomplexa
- Class: Conoidasida
- Order: Eucoccidiorida
- Suborder: Eimeriorina
- Family: Atoxoplasmatidae
- Genus: Atoxoplasma; Garnham, 1950

Species
- Atoxoplasma anthropoidii Atoxoplasma corvi Atoxoplasma desseri Atoxoplasma paddae Atoxoplasma serini

Genus of single-celled organisms

Atoxoplasma is a genus of parasitic alveolates in the phylum Apicomplexa. The species in this genus infect birds. They are spread by the orofaecal route.

== History ==
This genus was created by Garnham in 1950. The history of this genus has been plagued with confusion. Before 1909 the species in this genus were confused with those of the genus Haemoproteus. Between 1909 and 1937 they were considered to be species of the genus Toxoplasma. It was because of this historical confusion with Toxoplasma that Garnham chose the name Atoxoplasma for this genus.

Garnham defined this genus to be those parasites that infect the monocytes of birds, are strictly host specific, have a granular cytoplasm and a large nucleus. His choice of type species Atoxoplasma avium was later shown to be a junior synonym of Atoxplasma paddae. Lainson in 1958 published a study suggesting that these species were transmitted by ticks and that this genus was a synonym of Lankesterella - a genus of species that infects frogs.

The genus later became regarded as a junior synonym of the genus Isospora for those species that infect birds.

== Definition ==
The species in this genus develop asexually in both the blood and intestinal cells and form oocysts that are passed unsporulated in the feces, sporulate on the ground which then infect new hosts. The oocysts are tetrasporozoic, diplosporocystic and possess Stieda bodies in their sporocysts.

== Life cycle ==
The encysted sporozoites are ingested. The sporozoites decyst and invade the intestinal wall and from there reach the liver and other tissues including the blood cells where they replicate asexually. Within the intestine they undergo sexual reproduction, undergo gametogony and fertilization. The zygotes undergo division and form cysts which are passed out with the stool.

== Host records ==
- Canary (Serinus canarius)
- Israeli sparrow (Passer domesticus biblicus)
- Other birds of the Passeriformes order
