= Merocystis =

Scientific classification
- Domain: Eukaryota
- Clade: Sar
- Clade: Alveolata
- Phylum: Apicomplexa
- Class: Marosporida
- Family: Aggregatidae
- Genus: Merocystis; Dakin, 1911
- Species: M. kathae

Binomial name
- Merocystis kathae Dakin, 1911

Genus of single-celled organisms

Merocystis is a genus in the phylum Apicomplexa.

== History ==
This genus was created in 1911 by Dakin He discovered this parasite - Merocystis kathae - in the renal organ of the whelk (Buccinum undatum). Its life cycle has been studied in some detail by other workers.

A second species was described - Merocystis tellinovum - by Buchanan in 1979 but this has since been moved to the genus Pseudoklossia.

== Taxonomy ==
There is one species known in this genus.

== Description ==
The life cycle follows a seasonal course. The earliest stages may appear in the kidney any time between March and June. Growth proceeds and sexual differentiation takes place but mature gametes are not found until November, when the first stages of sporogony are first found. Mature spores containing sporozoites are formed in January and become increasingly common up to May. Degenerating stages of spores are common in summer.

The earliest stages within the renal organ are 10 μm in diameter.

To the naked eye the later stages of the parasite have the appearance of a rounded milky white dot.

The trophozoites appear opaque and occasionally granular.

Schizogony occurs in the host cell.

Morphological sexual differentiation is not detectable until growth is almost complete.

The microgametocyte divides into 32 nuclei. At this stage cleavage of the cytoplasm brings about the formation of uninucleate cytomeres. Nuclear division again occurs within these and these latter divisions form the microgametes.

The microgamete possesses a dark centre and a lighter ring round the periphery and is released from the host cell.

Fertilization occurs within the lumen of the renal organ.

After fertilisation, a thick membrane forms outside the zygote. The nucleus assumes a characteristic spindle shape and subsequently divides.

Nuclear divisions proceed until numerous cone shaped nuclei are found below the cell membrane. This cell membrane becomes folded and the nuclei sink in (the oocyst stage). Each is surrounded by a portion of cytoplasm to form a sporoblast. A single nuclear division then occurs and the two nuclei elongate to form sporozoites each with a small cytoplasmic body.

The oocyst has numerous sporocysts each with two sporozoites.
