= Eimeria stiedae =

Scientific classification
- Domain: Eukaryota
- Clade: Diaphoretickes
- Clade: Sar
- Clade: Alveolata
- Phylum: Apicomplexa
- Class: Conoidasida
- Order: Eucoccidiorida
- Family: Eimeriidae
- Genus: Eimeria
- Species: E. stiedae

Binomial name
- Eimeria stiedae (Lindemann, 1895)

Species of single-celled organism

Eimeria stiedae is a species of Eimeria that causes hepatic coccidiosis in rabbits. It was observed for the first time by Antonie van Leeuwenhoek in 1674.

== Life cycle ==
The rabbits ingest sporulated oocysts. Sporulated oocysts contain sporozoites that hatch and travel via the hepatic portal vein to the liver, and eventually penetrate the bile duct epithelium, where they undergo asexual reproduction known as schizogony. Rupture of the schizont consequently causes epithelial cell rupture and death. Merozoites will penetrate other cells and create more merozoites for one to several rounds. Eventually, a merozoite becomes a male microgamecyte and asexually reproduces in epithelial cells. A ruptured microgamecyte infects a cell with the female macrogamecyte and through sexual reproduction create a zygote. The zygote develops a protective shell before expulsion in the bile excreation and then the feces as an oocyst.

== Pathogenesis and pathology ==
The schizonts in the bile duct cause bile duct hyperplasia, and blockage of bile ducts leading to hepatomegaly and hence icterus. Due to liver failure, the abdomen will be distended with fluid.

== Diagnosis ==
The presence of oocysts on fecal flotation or impression smear of the liver are diagnostic for coccidiosis. The prepatent period is 18 days; sporulation occurs after three days.
