= Lankesterella (alveolate) =

Scientific classification
- Domain: Eukaryota
- Clade: Sar
- Superphylum: Alveolata
- Phylum: Apicomplexa
- Class: Conoidasida
- Order: Eucoccidiorida
- Family: Lankesterellidae
- Genus: Lankesterella; Labbé, 1899

Species
- Lankesterella alencari Lankesterella baznosanui Lankesterella bufonis Lankesterella hylae Lankesterella millani Lankesterella minima Lankesterella valsainensis Lankesterella macrovacuolata Lankesterella vacuolata Lankesterella petiti Lankesterella poeppigii Lankesterella tritonis

Genus of single-celled organisms

Lankesterella is a genus in the phylum Apicomplexa. Species in this genus infect amphibians, reptiles and birds.

The type species is Lankesterella minima.

== History ==
This genus was created by Labbe in 1899.

This genus is more commonly known as Atoxoplasma, it is a genus of parasitic alveolates in the phylum Apicomplexa. Atoxoplasma species in passerines are a group of organisms with intestinal and extraintestinal forms that can cause significant morbidity and mortality but are not transmissible by syringe.

These genera were united by Lainson in 1959. They were separated again by Levin in 1982. More commonly known as Atoxoplasma, it is a genus of parasitic alveolates in the phylum Apicomplexa. Apicomplexans are obligate intracellular parasites that typically invade blood cells. They have a distinct feature called the apical complex which helps in the penetration of the parasite into the host cell. Atoxoplasma sp. in passerines is a group of organisms with intestinal and extraintestinal forms that can cause significant morbidity and mortality. This latter name was coined by Garnham in 1950 for a group of parasites resembling Toxoplasma. Recent molecular studies revealed that some of the avian parasites which were initially thought to be Hepatozoon species were actually found to be closely related to the amphibian parasite Lankesterella minima. The apicomplexan genera Lankesterella and Schellackia were largely believed to form a monophyletic clade within the family Lankesterellidae. However, phylogenetic analyses revealed they have an independent evolutionary origin. Morphological identification is clearly not enough due to the many errors that occur in identification and hence the need for DNA barcoding for precise identification of the target species.

== Description ==
Lankesterella are extra-intestinal coccidia that invades the host blood. Criteria for the specific differentiation of Lankesterella are limited due to the fact that they are much similar in morphology with other apicomplexans such as Isosporas and hepatazoons. The most commonly described stages are the sporozoites found in the peripheral blood erythrocytes. Despite considerable structural divergences that have been observed among the sporozoite shapes, a system for taxonomic differentiation has not been developed. Descriptions of the stages developing in the viscera are less available as they require necropsy of the host. Lankesterella species are commonly known in amphibians and reptiles, but in recent times it has been found to also infect avian species. The oocysts usually contain more than 32 sporozoites. There are no sporocysts.

== Life cycle ==
In the species that infect amphibians, the vectors are leeches. However, the lifecycle in avian species is still unknown since they have similar blood stages to other related apicomplexans such as hepatozoons and isosporas.

The fact that Lankesterella and Schellackia is nested within the same paraphyletic Eimeriidae makes the lifecycle of these parasites to be considered as an evolutionary novelty. Transmission is by a blood-sucking vector that exerts a mechanical role in the transmission between hosts. The infective stages of the parasite remain completely dormant in the vectors without any development. Transmission in amphibians and reptiles occurs by blood-sucking arthropods such as leeches (intermediate hosts) or through the consumption of another definitive host (a snake eating an infected rat) and transmission is avian species is still unknown. This uncertainty is due to the fact that further investigations into the life cycle and the use of molecular tools for the identification of different species remain important in order to better understand the biology of the lankesterella species.

The sporozoites invade macrophages or endothelial cells. After development there, they invade circulating blood cells. The sporozoites may also invade liver parenchyma or tissue macrophages. A quite distinct feature of the parasite is that it invades the leukocytes in birds and erythrocytes in amphibians and reptiles

== Host records ==
=== Vertebrate ===
- Lankesterella hylae - European gree tree frog (Hyla caerula)
- Lankesterella minima - African common toad (Bufo regularis), cane toad (Bufo marinus), blue tit (Cyanistes caeruleus), rice field frogs (Hoplobatrachus rugulosus), frog (Rana esculenta), leopard frogs, (Rana pipiens)
- Lankesterella macrovacuolata - great tit (Parus major)
- Lankesterella vacuolata - common house martin (Delichon urbicum)
- Lankesterella valsainensis - Eurasian blue tit(Cyanistes caeruleus)
- Lankesterella kabeeni - sedge warbler (Acrocephalus schoenobaenus), marsh warbler (Acrocephalus palustris)
- Lankesterella poeppigii - frog (Bufo poeppigii)
- Lankesterella tritonis - newt (Triton cristatus)

Parasite species unknown

- White's tree frogs (Litoria caerulea)
- Oregon spotted frogs (Rana pretiosa)

=== Vector ===
- I. ricinus - tick (Ixodes ricinus)
- L. garnhami - mite (Dermanyssus gallinae)
- L. minima - leech (Hemiclepsis marginata)

== Synonyms ==
- L. garnhami - L. serini
- L. kabeeni - L. vacuolata,L. macrovacuolata
