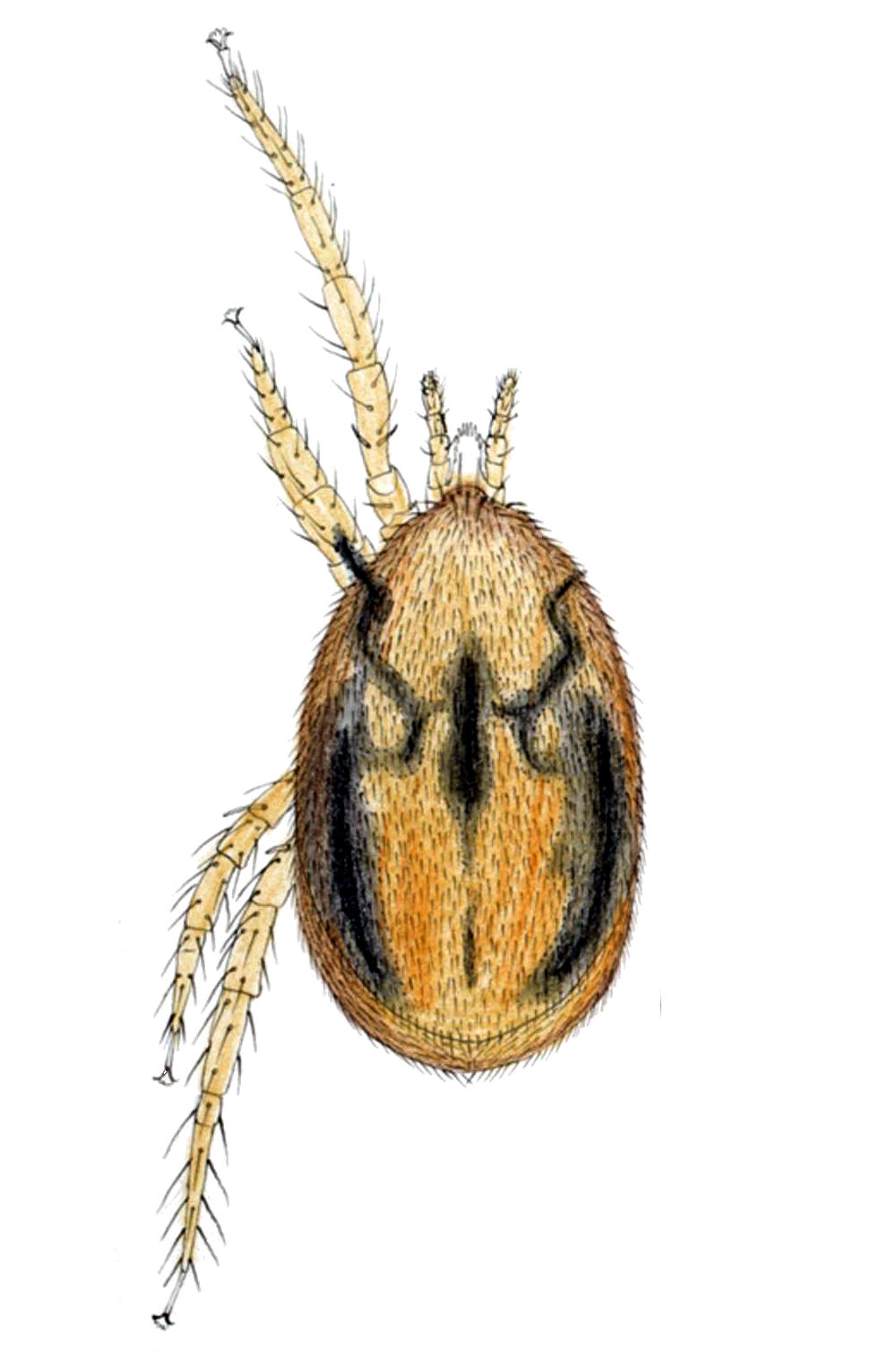
- Haemogamasus hirsutus

Scientific classification
- Kingdom: Animalia
- Phylum: Arthropoda
- Subphylum: Chelicerata
- Class: Arachnida
- Order: Mesostigmata
- Superfamily: Dermanyssoidea
- Family: Haemogamasidae; Oudemans, 1939

= Haemogamasidae =

Family of mites

Haemogamasidae is a family of mites in the order Mesostigmata.

== Genera ==
- Acanthochela Ewing, 1933
- Brevisterna Keegan, 1949
- Euhaemogamasus Ewing, 1933
- Eulaelaps Berlese, 1903
- Haemogamasus Berlese, 1889
- Ischyropoda Keegan, 1951
- Terasterna Zhou, Gu & Wen, 1995
