= Rhytidocystis =

Scientific classification
- Domain: Eukaryota
- Clade: Diaphoretickes
- Clade: SAR
- Clade: Alveolata
- Phylum: Apicomplexa
- Class: Conoidasida
- Order: Agamococcidiorida
- Family: Rhytidocystidae; Levine, 1979
- Genus: Rhytidocystis; Henneguy, 1907

Species
- See text

Synonyms
- (Genus): Dehornia Porchet-Hennerk 1972

Genus of single-celled organisms

Rhytidocystis is a genus of apicomplexans. It is the only genus within the monotypic family Rhytidocystidae. The species of this genus are parasitic protozoa found in marine annelids.

== Taxonomy ==
There are four species known in this genus:

- Rhytidocystis cyamus Rueckert & Leander 2009
- Rhytidocystis opheliae Henneguy 1907
- Rhytidocystis polygordiae
- Rhytidocystis sthenelais Porchet-Henneré 1972
