= Aggregata =

Scientific classification
- Domain: Eukaryota
- Clade: Diaphoretickes
- Clade: SAR
- Clade: Alveolata
- Phylum: Apicomplexa
- Class: Marosporida
- Family: Aggregatidae
- Genus: Aggregata; Frenzel, 1885

Species
- Aggregata andresi; Aggregata bathytherma; Aggregata coelomica; Aggregata conformi; Aggregata dobelli; Aggregata dromiae; Aggregata eberthi; Aggregata inachi; Aggregata jacquementi; Aggregata kudoi; Aggregata leandri; Aggregata maxima; Aggregata millerorum; Aggregata octopiana; Aggregata ovata; Aggregata patagonica; Aggregata portunidarum; Aggregata reticulosa; Aggregata sagittata; Aggregata schneideri; Aggregata sepiae; Aggregata siedleckii; Aggregata spinosa; Aggregata stellata; Aggregata vagans; Aggregata valdessensis

Genus of Conoidasida in the apicomplex phylum

Aggregata is a genus of parasitic alveolates belonging to the phylum Apicomplexa.

== Taxonomy ==
The organism found in the octopus was first named as Benedenia octopiana by Schneider in 1875. Since Benedenia was preoccupied, Eucoccidium was proposed as a replacement name by Lühe in 1903. The genus Aggregata was named by Frenzel in 1885 for parasites in a crustacean. These were later shown as two stages in the lifecycle of an identical organism by Léger and Duboscq.

This genus appears to be related to the adelinids and Hepatozoon but this needs confirmation.

== Life cycle ==
The life cycle was determined in 1914. These parasites are heteroxenous, with two hosts in their life cycle. Sexual stages are found in the digestive tract of cephalopods and asexual stages infect the digestive tract of crustaceans.

The parasites undergo merogony and gametogony in the digestive tract and sometimes in the other tissues of the cephalopod. The oocysts may be passed in the stool or form within the tissues of the cephalopod. When the oocysts are ingested by a crustacean - frequently a crab - they decyst and infect the digestive tract of the crustacean. The life cycle is completed when the crustacean is eaten by a cephalopod.

== Host records ==
- Aggregata andresi - ommastrephid squid (Martialia hyadesi)
- Aggregata bathytherma - Vulcanoctopus hydrothermalis
- Aggregata dobelli - Giant Pacific octopus (Octopus dofleini martini)
- Aggregata eberthi - common cuttlefish (Sepia officinalis)
- Aggregata kudio - Sepia elliptica
- Aggregata maxima - Sergestes robustus
- Aggregata millerorum - California two spotted octopus (Octopus bimaculoides)
- Aggregata octopiana - common octopus (Octopus vulgaris)
- Aggregata patagonica - Southern red octopus (Enteroctopus megalocyathus)
- Aggregata sagittata - European flying squid (Todarodes sagittatus)
- Aggregata vagans - Eupagurus species
- Aggregata valdessensis - Octopus tehuelchus

== Synonyms ==
- Aggregata duboscqi Moroff 1908 - Aggregata coelomica
- Aggregata frenzeli Moroff 1908 - Aggregata eberthi
- Aggregata mamillana Moroff 1908 - Aggregata eberthi
- Aggregata mingazzinii Moroff 1908 - Aggregata eberthi
- Aggregata minima Moroff 1908 - Aggregata eberthi
