= Octave Duboscq =

French zoologist, mycologist and parasitologist

Octave Joseph Duboscq (30 October 1868, Rouen – 18 February 1943, Nice) was a French zoologist, mycologist and parasitologist.

He obtained doctorates in medicine (1894) and sciences (1899) at the University of Caen. From 1904 to 1923, he was chair of zoology at the University of Montpellier, afterwards attaining the chair of marine biology at the Sorbonne. At the same time, he was also named director of the Arago laboratory in Banyuls-sur-Mer, and in 1931 became manager of the biological station at Villefranche-sur-Mer.

He was a member of the Belles-Lettres de Montpellier (1906–1923) and of the Académie des Sciences. In 1912 he was named chevalier of the Légion d'Honneur.

With Louis-Urbain-Eugène Léger, he was the circumscriber of various mycological and protozoan taxa; examples being — the fungi genus Harpella and the parasitic protozoan genus Selenococcidium.

He was honoured in 1920 in the naming of Duboscquella, which is a genus of dinoflagellates.

== Selected works ==
- La glande venimeuse de la scolopendre, 1894 – The venomous gland of Scolopendra.
- Recherches sur les chilopodes, 1899 – Research on chilopods.
- Titres et travaux scientifiques, 1904 – Scientific works.
- Études sur la sexualité chez les grégarines, 1909 (with Louis Jules Léger) – Studies on the sexuality of gregarines.
