= Eulaelaps =

Scientific classification
- Kingdom: Animalia
- Phylum: Arthropoda
- Subphylum: Chelicerata
- Class: Arachnida
- Order: Mesostigmata
- Family: Haemogamasidae
- Genus: Eulaelaps; Berlese, 1903

Genus of mites

Eulaelaps is a genus of mites in the family Haemogamasidae.

== Species ==
- Eulaelaps arboricola Uchikawa, 1978
- Eulaelaps dremomydis Gu & Wang, 1984
- Eulaelaps feideri (Fain, 1962)
- Eulaelaps heptacanthus Yang & Gu, 1985
- Eulaelaps herbosalis Uchikawa, 1978
- Eulaelaps hirundinis Uchikawa, 1978
- Eulaelaps huzhuensis Yang & Gu, 1985
- Eulaelaps linggangis Wen & Yan, 1985
- Eulaelaps multisetatus Takada, Fujita & Takahashi, 1977
- Eulaelaps onoi Takada, Fujita & Takahashi, 1977
- Eulaelaps oudemansi Turk, 1945
- Eulaelaps petauristae Liu & Ma, 1998
- Eulaelaps pratentis Zhou, 1981
- Eulaelaps silvaticus Uchikawa, 1978
- Eulaelaps silvestris Zhou, 1981
- Eulaelaps sinensis Tian, 1990
- Eulaelaps stabularis (C.L.Koch, 1839)
- Eulaelaps substabularis Yang & Gu, 1986
- Eulaelaps vulgaris Uchikawa, 1978
