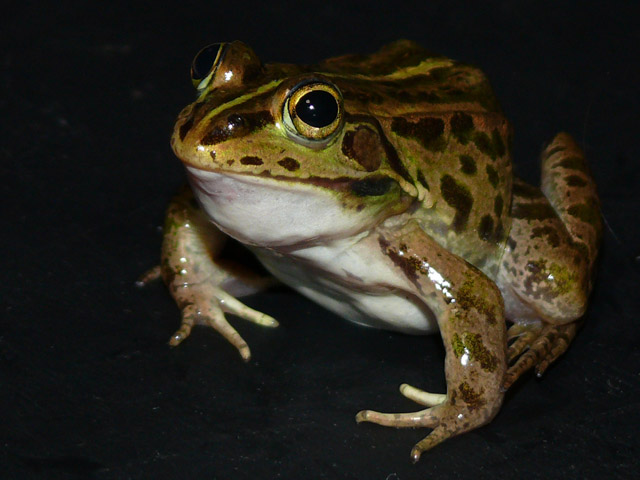
- Tokyo Daruma pond frog
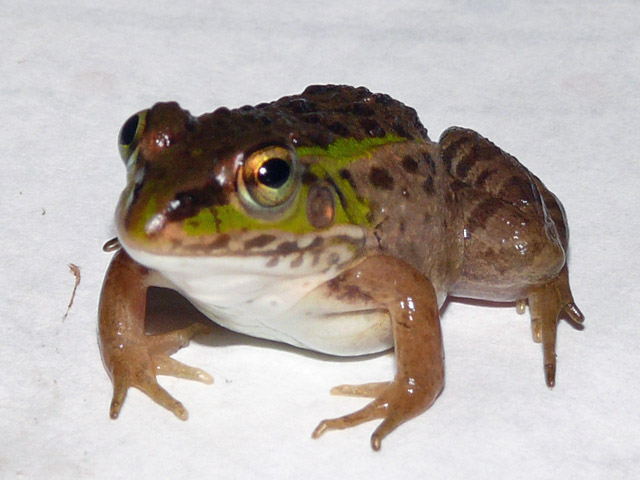
- Nagoya Daruma pond frog

Conservation status
- Least Concern (IUCN 3.1)

Scientific classification
- Kingdom: Animalia
- Phylum: Chordata
- Class: Amphibia
- Order: Anura
- Family: Ranidae
- Genus: Pelophylax
- Species: P. porosus

Binomial name
- Pelophylax porosus (Cope, 1868)

Synonyms
- Tomopterna porosa Cope, 1868; Rana porosa (Cope, 1868)

= Daruma pond frog =

Species of amphibian

The Daruma pond frog (Pelophylax porosus) is a species of frog in the family Ranidae. It has two subspecies, P. porosus porosus (the Tokyo Daruma pond frog) and P. porosus brevipodus (the Nagoya Daruma pond frog). It is endemic to Japan. The average size of males is 3.5 to 6.2 cm, while females are from 3.7 to 7.3 cm.

Its natural habitats are temperate grassland, rivers, freshwater marshes, ponds, irrigated land, and canals and ditches. Their primary habitat is rice fields, as it is important for breeding and producing new frogs. It is not considered threatened by the IUCN.

== Behaviour ==
=== Diet and hunting ===
The Daruma pond frog's diet consists primarily of insects and spiders. However, they also will consume ants, beetles, dipterans, bugs, pond snails and orthopterans. They hunt by utilizing their hind-legs to jump at prey that come within their feeding range.

=== Reproduction ===
Daruma pond frogs' breeding occurs during April to July, and their lifespans within 3 to 4 years.
