= PlasmoDB =

Content
- Description: Plasmodium genome database
- Organisms: Plasmodium

Contact
- Laboratory: Center for Tropical & Emerging Global Diseases
- Authors: Stoeckert CJ Jr
- Primary citation: PMID 18957442

Access
- Website: http://PlasmoDB.org

PlasmoDB is a biological database for the genus Plasmodium. The database is a member of the EuPathDB project. The database contains extensive genome, proteome and metabolome information relating to malaria parasites.

== See also ==
- Plasmodium
- Malaria
