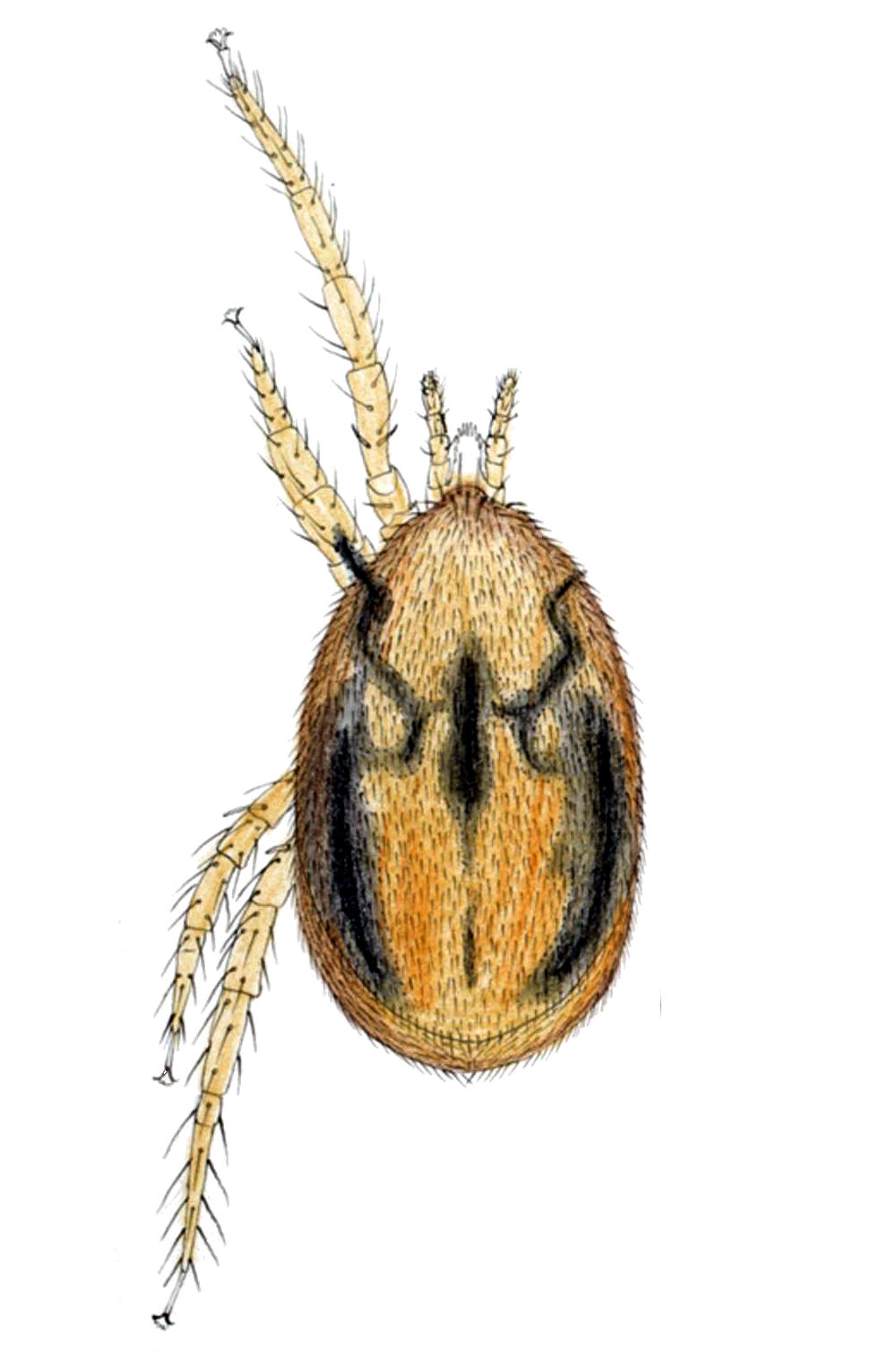
- Haemogamasus hirsutus

Scientific classification
- Domain: Eukaryota
- Kingdom: Animalia
- Phylum: Arthropoda
- Subphylum: Chelicerata
- Class: Arachnida
- Order: Mesostigmata
- Family: Haemogamasidae
- Genus: Haemogamasus; Berlese, 1889

Species
- See text

= Haemogamasus =

Genus of mites

Haemogamasus is a genus of mites in the family Haemogamasidae. In North America, they mostly infect rodents, in addition to other small mammals such as shrews, talpids, and Virginia opossums.

An unidentified immature Haemogamasus has been found on the marsh rice rat (Oryzomys palustris) in Georgia.

== Species ==
- Haemogamasus ambulans
- Haemogamasus angustus Ma, Ye & Zhang, 1996
- Haemogamasus arvicolarum Berlese, 1920
- Haemogamasus bascanus Senotrusova, 1985
- Haemogamasus cucurbitoides Wang & Pan, in Wang, Pan & Yan 1994
- Haemogamasus daliensis Tian, 1990
- Haemogamasus dauricus Bregetova
- Haemogamasus dimini Senotrusova, 1987
- Haemogamasus dorsalis Teng & Pan
- Haemogamasus emeiensis Zhou, 1981
- Haemogamasus ghanii Williams, in Williams, Smiley & Redington 1978
- Haemogamasus gongshanensis Tian & Gu, 1989
- Haemogamasus gui Tian, 1990
- Haemogamasus harperi
- Haemogamasus hirsutus Berlese, 1889
- Haemogamasus horridus Michael, 1892
- Haemogamasus huangzhongensis Yang & Gu, 1986
- Haemogamasus keegani
- Haemogamasus liberensis Domrow, 1960
- Haemogamasus liponyssoides
- Haemogamasus longitarsus
- Haemogamasus macrodentilis Piao & Ma, 1980
- Haemogamasus mandschuricus Vitz.
- Haemogamasus microti Senotrusova, 1985
- Haemogamasus multidentis Guo & Gu, 1997
- Haemogamasus nidi Michael, 1892
- Haemogamasus nidiformis Bregetova, 1956
- Haemogamasus occidentalis
- Haemogamasus onychomydis
- Haemogamasus pingi Chang
- Haemogamasus pontiger (Berlese, 1903)
- Haemogamasus postsinuatus Liu & Ma, 2002
- Haemogamasus qinghaiensis Yang & Gu, 1985
- Haemogamasus reidi
- Haemogamasus sanxiaensis Liu & Ma, in Liu, Hu & Ma 2001
- Haemogamasus serdjukovae Bregetova, 1949
- Haemogamasus sexsetosus Guo & Gu, 1998
- Haemogamasus suncus Allred
- Haemogamasus tangkeensis Zhou, 1981
- Haemogamasus thomomysi Williams, in Williams, Smiley & Redington 1978
- Haemogamasus trapezoideus Teng & Pan, 1964
- Haemogamasus trifurcisetus Zhou & Jiang, 1987
- Haemogamasus yushuensis Sun & Yin, 1995

== See also ==
- List of parasites of the marsh rice rat

== Literature cited ==
- Estébanes-González, M.L. and Cervantes, F.A. 2005. Mites and ticks associated with some small mammals in Mexico (subscription required). International Journal of Acarology 31(1):23–37.
- Whitaker, J.O., Walters, B.L., Castor, L.K., Ritzi, C.M. and Wilson, N. 2007. Host and distribution lists of mites (Acari), parasitic and phoretic, in the hair or on the skin of North American wild mammals north of Mexico: records since 1974. Faculty Publications from the Harold W. Manter Laboratory of Parasitology, University of Nebraska, Lincoln 1:1–173.
- Wilson, N. and Durden, L.A. 2003. Ectoparasites of terrestrial vertebrates inhabiting the Georgia Barrier Islands, USA: an inventory and preliminary biogeographical analysis (subscription required). Journal of Biogeography 30(8):1207–1220.
