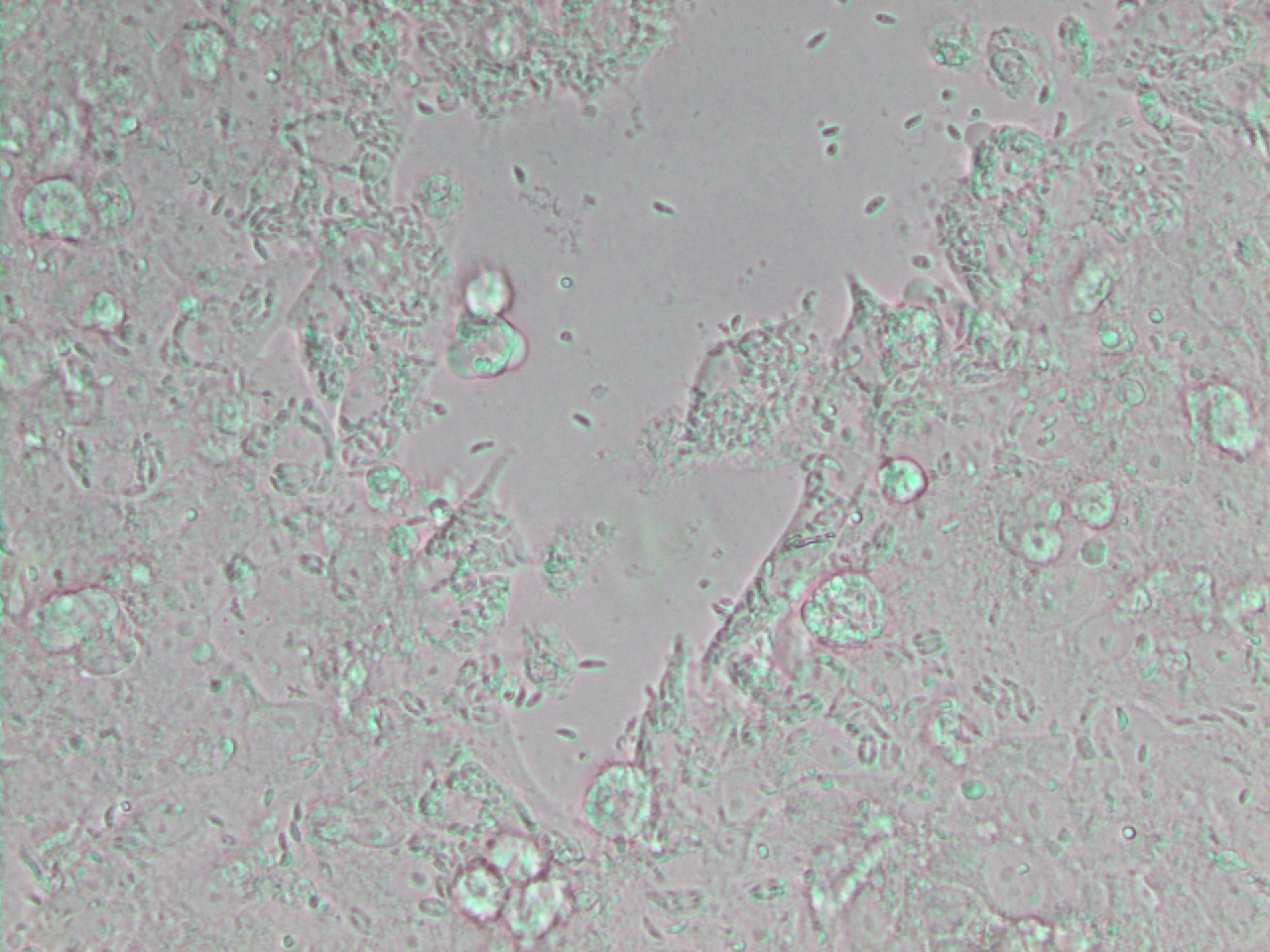
- Neospora caninum

Scientific classification
- Domain: Eukaryota
- Clade: Sar
- Clade: Alveolata
- Phylum: Apicomplexa
- Class: Conoidasida
- Order: Eucoccidiorida
- Family: Sarcocystidae
- Genus: Neospora; Dubey, Carpenter, Speer, Topper & Uggla, 1988

Species
- Neospora caninum; Neospora hughesi

= Neospora =

Genus of single-celled organisms responsible for the disease neosporosis

Neospora is a single celled parasite of livestock and companion animals. It was not discovered until 1984 in Norway, where it was found in dogs. Neosporosis, the disease that affects cattle and companion animals, has a worldwide distribution. Neosporosis causes abortions in cattle and paralysis in companion animals. It is highly transmissible and some herds can have up to a 90% prevalence. Up to 33% of pregnancies can result in aborted fetuses on one dairy farm. In many countries this organism is the main cause of miscarriage in cattle. Neosporosis is now considered as a major cause of miscarriage in cattle worldwide. Many reliable diagnostic tests are commercially available. Neospora caninum does not appear to be infectious to humans. In dogs, Neospora caninum can cause neurological signs, especially in congenitally infected puppies, where it can form cysts in the central nervous system.

== Genome ==
The genome of Neospora caninum has been sequenced. The results suggest a European origin for this parasite.

== Effects of disease ==
Neospora caninum is a major pathogen of cattle and dogs that occasionally causes clinical infections in horses, goats, sheep, and deer as well. The domestic dog is the only known definitive host for N. caninum. In cattle, N. caninum is a major cause of bovine abortion in many countries and is one of the most efficiently transmitted parasites with up to 90% of some bovine herds infected. N. caninum causes abortion in both beef and dairy cattle. Another important factor is the gestational age and hence immunocompetence of the fetus at the time of infection. Early in gestation, N. caninum infection of the placenta and subsequently the fetus usually proves fatal, whereas infection occurring in mid to late pregnancy may result in the birth of a congenitally infected but otherwise healthy calf. Recent studies have broadened the list of known intermediate hosts to include birds. N. caninum has recently been found to infect domestic chickens and house sparrows (Passer domesticus) which may become infected after ingesting parasite oocysts from the soil. The presence of birds in cattle pastures has been correlated to higher infection rates in cattle. Birds may be an important link in the transmission of N. caninum to other animals.

== Epidemiology ==
The life cycle is similar to Toxoplasma. An infected dog will pass the oocysts through its feces and infect food or water. A cow or other animal will then up take the parasite. The parasite will undergo asexual reproduction in the animal's muscle until it is eaten by a dog. There, sexual reproduction will occur and oocysts will be created and passed through the feces. Dogs are often the definitive host but can act as an intermediate host as well. Cows are usually the intermediate host. No horizontal cow-to-cow transmission have been shown, although salival interactions have been suggested. Vertical transmission can occur when an infected cow gives birth to an infected calf—the calf survives the infection and grows into an adult. Vertical route is the major route of transmission in cattle and is extremely efficient as the rate of transmission is usually between 80 and 100%. A heifer calf that is born congenitally infected is capable of transmitting the infection to the next generation when she becomes pregnant, thus maintaining the infection in the herd. Transplacental transmission in cattle is considered the major route of transmission. The life cycle is typified by three infectious stages: tachyzoites, tissue cysts, and oocysts Tachyzoites and tissue cysts are the stages found in the intermediate hosts, and they occur intracellularly.

== Detection of disease ==
Detection: the presence of cerebral and cardiac lesions can be seen on aborted bovine fetuses originating from a single farm. The parasite is identified in the tissues of many bovine aborted fetuses but also of stillborn calves and, rarely, of clinically affected newborn calves. The diagnosis of the infection is assisted through histopathology and immunohistochemical examination of aborted fetuses and serologic testing of cattle for evidence of infection. The abortion is the only clinical sign and can occur from the third month of pregnancy and onwards. Most of the abortions take place between the 5th and 6th months of pregnancy The fetus is either resorbed, autolyzed, mummified, stillborn, born alive with clinical signs, or born clinically normal but chronically infected. At calving, infected calves may be clinically normal or may have neurologic signs, be underweight or unable to stand.

== Prevention and control ==
Embryo transfer is recommended as a method of reproduction to reduce the chances of contracting the disease, as long as the disease status of the donor cow is checked. It is not recommended to rebreed heifers or cows that have this disease. Seropositive animals should be culled. To prevent horizontal transmission it is important to prevent the contamination of feed and water via the shedding of oocysts by dogs and possibly other canids like the fox. These animals should not have access to animal premises although this might be difficult to achieve. There are no drugs or vaccines available yet to prevent or control the disease.
