= Schellackia =

Scientific classification
- Domain: Eukaryota
- Clade: Sar
- Superphylum: Alveolata
- Phylum: Apicomplexa
- Class: Conoidasida
- Order: Eucoccidiorida
- Family: Lankesterellidae
- Genus: Schellackia; Reichenow, 1920

Species
- Schellackia balli Schellackia bolivari Schellackia brugooi Schellackia calotesi Schellackia cf agamae Schellackia golvani Schellackia iguanae Schellackia landauae Schellackia legeri Schellackia occidentalis Schellackia orientalis Schellackia ptyodacryli Schellackia weinbergi

Genus of single-celled organisms

The genus Schellackia comprises obligate unicellular eukaryotic parasites within the phylum Apicomplexa, and infects numerous species of lizards and amphibians worldwide. Schellackia is transmitted via insect vectors, primarily mites and mosquitoes, which take up the parasite in blood meals. These vectors then subsequently infect reptilian and amphibian which consume the infected insects. The parasites deform erythrocytes of the host into crescents, and can be visualized using a blood smear.

The type species, Schellackia bolivari, was described by Anton Reichenow in 1919.

== History of knowledge ==
Schellackia was first described by Anton Reichenow in 1919, with the type species Schellackia bolivari having been discovered parasitizing the spiny-footed lizard Acanthodactylus erythrurus and the Spanish Psammodromus hispanicus within the Iberian Peninsula.

At first, many difficulties in describing new species were present – very few characteristics could be described from blood sporozoites within the primary host, with most defining characteristics being restricted to the parasite’s endogenous stages within the gut epithelium of the host. This led to relatively few described species for a parasite genus that was supposedly very geographically widespread.

In more recent years, however, molecular characterization methods have allowed a more precise determination of species identity and their phylogenetic relationship.

== Life cycle ==
As is typical of Apicomplexans, Schellackia replicates via multiple fission. The parasite utilizes both merogony (asexual) and gametogony (sexual), with both processes occurring within the mucosal epithelium of the duodenum of infected hosts.

Young meronts can be expected to be around 6 μm in diameter, growing up to around 30 μm as they mature before they divide into merozoites. However, these figures and the time required for maturation can vary between species. The meronts subsequently split via cytokinesis, dividing into usually around 8 to 32 merozoites which are released as the host cell ruptures. Post-merogony, the development of merozoites produces a residual body of variable size. Merozoites are non-motile and proceed to infect other cells in order to rapidly reproduce.

Gametogony occurs later in infection, generally after the majority of merogony activity. Male gametocytes (microgamonts) divide to form flagellated microgametes, while female gametocytes (macrogamonts) concurrently differentiate into macrogametes, sometimes even within the same host cell. These gametes then fuse forming zygotes within the epithelial layer of the duodenum of the host.

Subsequently, zygotes transition to an oocyst stage. This transition is marked by the formation of large refractile bodies within the oocysts, soon followed by the appearance of developing sporozoites. The mature octonucleate oocyst is a characteristic phase of Schellackia’s lifecycle. Eventually, the oocyst divides by endopolygeny into eight sporozoites which combine with extensions of the refractory body as they exit the ruptured oocyst. This process leaves behind empty spaces within the epithelium and lamina propria of the host.

The sporozoites then make their way into the host’s blood cells including erythrocytes, leucocytes and macrophages. The sporozoites often exist within a common parasitophorous vacuole which is shared with other sporozoites, although some also dwell within their own individual vacuole.

The presence of sporozoites within the blood cells of the host allows the parasite to proliferate to additional hosts via blood-consuming insect vectors such as mites, ticks and mosquitos.

== Hosts and habitat ==
Schellackia species infect reptiles and amphibians all around the world, and are present in all continents except Antarctica. Although they have primarily been studied in lizards, they have been found to infect other animals including the Brazilian tree-frog, Phrynohyas venulosa. The parasites are highly host specific, tending to infect a single host genus even when other lizard genera are present within the same geographical area. Multiple species of Schellackia are named after their archetypal host, such as Schellackia occidentalis and Schellackia agama.

== Description of the organism ==
Schellackia gametocytes are contained within parasitophorous vacuoles consisting of two membranes that are connected by numerous points of contact. The outer layer is thicker and bilaminate, while the inner layer comprises a single thinner structure. The vacuoles containing macrogametocytes are dense with fine granular material, while such material is largely absent from vacuoles containing microgametocytes.

The microgametocytes and microgametes are contained within their own membrane within the vacuole. Developing microgametocytes have a peripheral nucleus without a visible nucleolus but contain dense patches of peripheral chromatin. The surface of the microgametocyte is covered in deep invaginations which provide increased surface area. Microgametes have flagella with a typical 9+2 axoneme structure, and five microtubules run parallel to the nucleus along the length of the gamete.

Macrogametocytes are bound by a pellicle comprising two membranes perforated by multiple micropores. Two shapes of mitochondria are present – large, rounded mitochondria with tubular cristae are located beneath the pellicle, while smaller elongated mitochondria with a single row of cristae are present in aggregates. The nucleus is larger than the one found in microgametocytes and contains a large, compact nucleolus. The cytoplasm contains a dense RER network, as well as food, lipid, and other various vesicles. The presence of a high density of amylopectin granules in the cytoplasm causes it to have a foamy appearance, a characteristic maintained in the zygote.

Schellackia sporozoites exist either free-floating or within a parasitophorous vacuole within a host cell. On occasion, multiple sporozoites have been observed to fit into a single expanded parasitophorous vacuole. The space within the vacuole surrounding the sporozoites contains a fine granular substance, and sometimes membranous residues. The sporozoites themselves are bound by a pellicle and contain a nucleus with a nucleolus and peripheral chromatin. One or two refractile bodies are also present, as well as multiple large mitochondria, amylopectin granules, and micronemes that extend from the apical tip along the length of the sporozoites.

An important defining characteristic of the genus Schellackia is its octonucleate oocyst stage within the small intestine of a primary host – a combination of the presence of such oocysts as well as a lack of other parasites within the geographical area which share similar characteristics is sufficient to identify the genus. The oocysts are enclosed in a translucent wall that is partially impermeable to Giemsa stain, and the cells leave behind empty rounded spaces upon expiration.
