= Urbain-Louis-Eugène Léger =

Urbain-Louis-Eugène Léger (7 September 1866 – 7 July 1948) was a French zoologist who was a specialist on aquatic protists, fish parasites, and fish farming. He served as a professor of zoology at Grenoble.

Léger was born in Loches, son of a school teacher. He grew up in Touraine and went to the University of Poitiers where he studied under Aimé Schneider, receiving a doctorate for studies on gregarines. He then worked in Marseilles and studied medicine, receiving a medical degree in 1895 for studies on arteries in the aged. He became a lecturer at Grenoble in 1898 and became a full professor in 1904. Léger's researches included work on the Gregarinida in collaboration with Octave Duboscq. He also studied the life-history of Cnidospora, flagellates, trichomycetes, and ciliates. He also studied the fishes of the Dauphiné region examining habitat characteristics and was later involved in introductions of fish species into the Alps and into Madagascar. He was also an excellent illustrator and watercolour artist.
