= Eukaryotic Pathogen Database =

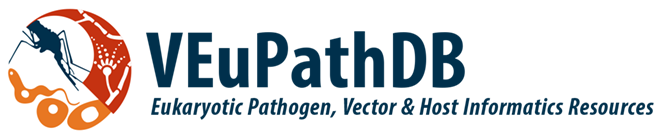
VEuPathDB logo

The Eukaryotic Pathogen, Vector & Host Informatics Resources, or VEuPathDB, is a database of genomic and other large-scale datasets related to various eukaryotic pathogens, as well as their vectors and hosts. VEuPathDB stores data related to its organisms of interest and provides tools for searching through and analyzing the data. It currently consists of 14 component data platforms, each dedicated to a certain research topic, in addition to the main VEuPathDB portal website. VEuPathDB includes:

- Genomics resources covering eukaryotic protozoan parasites
- Host responses to parasite infection (HostDB)
- Orthologs (OrthoMCL)
- Clinical and epidemiological data (ClinEpiDB)
- Microbiome data (MicrobiomeDB)

== History ==
VEuPathDB traces its origins to efforts in the early 2000s to organize genomic and related large-scale biological data for infectious disease research. Initial projects such as PlasmoDB (for Plasmodium spp.), CryptoDB (for Cryptosporidium), and ToxoDB (for Toxoplasma gondii) were developed as standalone databases focused on specific eukaryotic pathogens. These early component sites were integrated under the umbrella of ApiDB, established by the U.S. National Institute of Allergy and Infectious Diseases (NIAID) to support apicomplexan parasite research.

As the scope of the resource expanded to include a broader range of eukaryotic pathogens, the project was renamed EuPathDB to reflect its extended taxonomic coverage.

In parallel, VectorBase was developed to serve the invertebrate vector research community by providing similar genomic and functional datasets for disease vectors such as mosquitoes and ticks. Both EuPathDB and VectorBase were funded as part of the NIH Bioinformatics Resource Centers (BRC) program, which began supporting pathogen and vector genomic resources in 2004.

In 2019, these two major resources were formally merged to create VEuPathDB, a unified bioinformatics platform integrating the strengths of EuPathDB and VectorBase into a single portal. This merger brought together data for eukaryotic pathogens, their invertebrate vectors, and relevant host organisms, supported by common infrastructure, analysis tools, and a shared web interface. The combined resource was designed to streamline data access and analysis for researchers studying infectious diseases and host-pathogen interactions.

Since the merger, VEuPathDB has continued to grow in scope and capability, incorporating thousands of curated datasets across diverse organisms and data types, expanding advanced search and visualization tools, and evolving its infrastructure to accommodate new analytic methods and user needs.

== Overview of Resources and Tools ==
VEuPathDB provides free online access to omics data from eukaryotic protozoan and fungal pathogens, arthropod vectors of disease, and host responses to pathogen infection. The goal of VEuPathDB is to make data easily accessible, findable, and reusable by laboratory scientists. All integrated data and analyses follow standard workflows and methods to ensure data accuracy and enable data interoperability.

Integrated data types include genomes and annotation (both structural and functional), transcriptomic data (e.g., single-cell/ bulk RNA-sequence and microarray data), proteomic data (e.g., mass spectrometry evidence and quantitative data), isolate sequencing data used for variant calling and copy number variation determination, epigenomics, whole-genome phenotyping data (e.g., CRISPR screens and large-scale subcellular localization data), etc.

Standard analyses provide additional data such as InterPro domains, signal peptide and transmembrane domain predictions, and metabolic pathways.

These data and analyses underly the Search Strategies system and enable in silico experiments that query across datasets, data types, and organisms.

== Component databases ==
Currently, VEuPathDB consists of 14 component data platforms, each with a particular focus, and a main portal site:

- VEuPathDB (The main portal site)
- AmoebaDB (Pathogenic Amoeba)
- CryptoDB (Cryptosporidium species)
- FungiDB (Pathogenic fungi)
- GiardiaDB (Giardia species)
- MicrosporidiaDB (Microsporidia species)
- PiroplasmaDB (Pathogenic Piroplasmida)
- PlasmoDB (Plasmodium species)
- ToxoDB (Toxoplasma species)
- TrichDB (Trichomonas species)
- TriTrypDB (Kinetoplastida such as Leishmania and Trypanosoma species)
- HostDB (Host response to parasite infection)
- OrthoMCL (For orthologous protein sequences)
- ClinEpiDB (for data from clinical and epidemiological studies and trials)
- MicrobiomeDB (for microbiome data)

== Subscription Model ==
In September 2024, the National Institute of Allergy and Infectious Diseases (NIAID) contract supporting VEuPathDB was not renewed, a decision that shocked the user community. Starting in March 2025, VEuPathDB implemented a voluntary subscription model to keep the resources open and accessible to everyone while sustaining operations.
