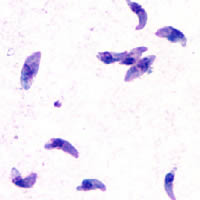
- Toxoplasma gondii tachyzoites

Scientific classification
- Domain: Eukaryota
- Supergroup: Alveolata
- Phylum: Apicomplexa
- Class: Conoidasida
- Order: Eucoccidiorida
- Suborder: Eimeriorina
- Family: Sarcocystidae; Poche 1913

Genera
- Besnoitia; Cystoisospora; Frenkelia; Hammondia; Heydornia; Hyaloklossia; Neospora; Nephroisospora; Sarcocystis; Toxoplasma

= Sarcocystidae =

Family of single-celled organisms

The Sarcocystidae are a family of Apicomplexa associated with a variety of diseases in humans and other animals.

== Taxonomy ==
Genera in this family include:

- Besnoitia
- Cystoisospora
- Frenkelia
- Hammondia
- Heydornia
- Hyaloklossia
- Neospora
- Nephroisospora
- Sarcocystis
- Toxoplasma

== Evolution ==
The genera Neospora and Toxoplasma appear to have diverged about 28 million years ago.
