= Heteroxeny =

Several-host parasitic lifestyle

A dixenous (diheteroxenous) life cycle: the apicomplexan parasitic protist Babesia microti and its two different taxonomic hosts, the deer tick and the white-footed mouse.

Heteroxeny, or heteroxenous development, characterizes a parasite whose development involves several host species. Heteroxeny has been used as the basis for splitting genera.

When there are two or three hosts, the development cycle is named diheteroxenous or triheteroxenous, respectively. More ambiguously, these terms are sometimes synonymized as dixenous or trixenous.

The etymology of the terms heteroxeny / heteroxenous derives from the two ancient Greek words ἕτερος (héteros), meaning "other, another, different", and ξένος (xénos), meaning "foreign".

In mycology, the term heteroecious has also been used for parasitic fungi with multiple hosts, and the terms can be used synonymously.
