= Rasajeyna =

Scientific classification
- Domain: Eukaryota
- Clade: Diaphoretickes
- Clade: SAR
- Clade: Alveolata
- Phylum: Apicomplexa
- Class: Conoidasida
- Order: Eucoccidiorida
- Family: Adeleidae
- Genus: Rasajeyna; Beesley, 1977
- Species: R. nannyla

Binomial name
- Rasajeyna nannyla Beesley, 1977

Genus of single-celled organisms

Rasajeyna is a genus of parasitic alveolates in the phylum Apicomplexa. This genus has been little studied and not much is known about these protozoa.

== History ==
This genus was created in 1977 by Beesley.

== Taxonomy ==
There is one species in this genus, Rasajeyna nannyla.

== Description ==
These protozoa infect the midgut of Tipula species (craneflies).

They are transmitted by the orofaecal route.

The oocyst is somewhat unusual with a double layered wall which surrounds up to 18 sporocysts. Each sporocyst contain only a single sporozoite.

== Host records ==
- Tipula paludosa
- Tipula vittata
