= Angeiocystis =

Scientific classification
- Domain: Eukaryota
- Clade: Sar
- Superphylum: Alveolata
- Phylum: Apicomplexa
- Class: Conoidasida
- Order: Eucoccidiorida
- Family: Aggregatidae
- Genus: Angeiocystis; Brasil, 1904
- Species: A. audouinae

Binomial name
- Angeiocystis audouinae Brasil, 1904

Genus of single-celled organisms

Angeiocystis is a genus of parasitic alveolate eukaryotes belonging to the phylum Apicomplexa.

== Taxonomy ==
This genus was described in 1904 by Brasil.

Currently there is only one species recognised in this genus, Angeiocystis audouinae.

== Life cycle ==
This species infects the heart of marine polychaete worms

The sporocyts may contain up to 30 sporozoites. The sporozoites are slender and curved with length of up to 25 μm.

The gamonts are initially sausage shaped and later become spherical.

The microgametes are biflagellated and several are formed from each microgametocyte.

== Host records ==
This parasite was described from the worm Cirriformia tentaculata (family Cirratulidae). This genus was previously known as Audouinia.
