= Dorisa =

Scientific classification
- Domain: Eukaryota
- Clade: Sar
- Superphylum: Alveolata
- Phylum: Apicomplexa
- Class: Conoidasida
- Order: Eucoccidiorida
- Family: Eimeriidae
- Genus: Dorisa; Levine, 1980

Species
- Dorisa aethiopsaris Dorisa arizonensis Dorisa bengalensis Dorisa chakravartyi Dorisa graculae Dorisa hareni Dorisa harpia Dorisa hoarei Dorisa indica Dorisa mandali Dorisa passeries Dorisa rayi Dorisa vagabundae

Genus of single-celled organisms

Dorisa is a genus of parasitic alveolates in the phylum Apicomplexa.

The genus was separated from the genus Dorisiella by Levine in 1980. Dorisiella was created for a parasite infecting a marine polychaete by Ray in 1930. Levine separated off a number of species that while morphologically similar occurred in vertebrates rather that polychaetes.

== Life cycle ==
The species in this genus infect the gastrointestinal wall of vertebrates.

== Description ==
Genus diagnosis is dependent on the oocyst: there is a definite cell wall in this genus whereas in Dorisiella the oocyst wall is membrane like.

== Host records ==
- Dorisa harpia - lesser hairy winged bat (Harpiocephalus harpia lasyurus)
