= Isospora hammondi =

Scientific classification
- Domain: Eukaryota
- Clade: Sar
- Clade: Alveolata
- Phylum: Apicomplexa
- Class: Conoidasida
- Order: Eucoccidiorida
- Family: Eimeriidae
- Genus: Isospora
- Species: I. hammondi

Binomial name
- Isospora hammondi Barnard, Ernst, and Stevens, 1971

Species of single-celled organism

Isospora hammondi is an apicomplexan parasite of the genus Isospora that infects the marsh rice rat (Oryzomys palustris). It was discovered at Tuskegee National Forest, Macon County, Alabama, and formally described in 1971. The specific name honors Dr. Datus M. Hammond of Utah State University.

Isospora datusi is sometimes known as Isospora hammondi (Frenkel, 1974).

The oocyst is about egg-shaped and has a smooth, single-layered wall about 1 μm thick. It is 24 to 30 μm long and 16 to 21 μm broad when sporulated. There are two sporocyst, 13 to 18 μm long and 11 to 15 μm broad, with four sporozoites each. The sporozoites are placed parallel along the long axis of the sporocyst. The sporozoites are slightly curved in form and sausage-shaped and lack refractile globules. Near one end, there is one a light, rounded nuclear region. Unlike most rodent-infecting Isospora species, I. hammondi lacks both an oocyst residuum and Stieda bodies. Most other species that also lack both of these structures have a differently shaped oocyst. Two other species—Isospora uralica from the field mouse Apodemus sylvaticus and Isospora ordubadica from the gerbil Meriones persicus—differ in size and other details.

In Alabama, I. hammondi was recovered in 3 of 19 examined marsh rice rats. At room temperature, it takes one and a half days for the oocysts to sporulate. The oocysts were found in the small and large intestines; the normal location in the host is unknown. In four marsh rice rats inoculated with I. hammondi, oocysts began to be passed on the sixth or seventh day and went on passing them for three or four days.

== Literature cited ==
- Barnard, W.P., Ernst, J.V. and Stevens, R.O. 1971. Eimeria palustris sp. n. and Isospora hammondi sp. n. (Coccidia: Eimeriidae) from the marsh rice rat, Oryzomys palustris (Harlan) (subscription required). The Journal of Parasitology 57(6):1293–1296.
- Tadros and Laarman, J.J. 1982. Current concepts on the biology, evolution and taxonomy of tissue cystforming eimeriid coccidia (subscription required). Advances in Parasitology 20:293–468.
