= Defretinella =

Scientific classification
- Domain: Eukaryota
- Clade: Sar
- Superphylum: Alveolata
- Phylum: Apicomplexa
- Class: Conoidasida
- Order: Protococcidiorida
- Family: Eleutheroschizonidae
- Genus: Defretinella; Henneré, 1966
- Species: D. eulaliae

Binomial name
- Defretinella eulaliae Henneré, 1966

Genus of single-celled organisms

Defretinella is a genus of parasitic alveolates of the phylum Apicomplexa.

== Taxonomy ==
This genus had been placed in the family Barrouxiidae by Levine but has since been moved to the family Eleutheroschizonidae.

There is one species recognised in this genus — Defretinella eulaliae.

== Description ==
This species infects a polychete species — the green leaf worm (Eulalia viridis).

The oocysts contain >50 bivalved sporocysts: each sporocyst in its turn contains numerous sporozoites. The sporocysts are bivalved.
