= Adelea =

Scientific classification
- Domain: Eukaryota
- Clade: Sar
- Clade: Alveolata
- Phylum: Apicomplexa
- Class: Conoidasida
- Order: Eucoccidiorida
- Family: Adeleidae
- Subfamily: Ithaniinae
- Genus: Adelea

Species
- Adelea hartmanni Adelea ovata

Genus of single-celled organisms

Adelea is a genus of parasitic alveolates of the phylum Apicomplexa.

The name is derived from the Greek word adēlos (meaning unseen).

The genus was created by Mesnili.

== Taxonomy ==
Adelea together with the genera Adelina and Ithania form the subfamily Ithaniinae. This subfamily was created in 1947 by Ludwig to accommodate these genera of eimeria that share certain morphological features and infect the digestive tracts of insects. The genus Adelina was created by Hesse in 1911 because of morphological differences between the species.

== Description ==
The species in this genus are parasitic on arthropods and have two sporozoites in each sporocyst.

During syngny, four microgametes associate with the macrogamete. One microgamete penetrates the macrogamete and the remaining three die off.
