= Isospora ashmoonensis =

Scientific classification
- Domain: Eukaryota
- Clade: Diaphoretickes
- Clade: SAR
- Clade: Alveolata
- Phylum: Apicomplexa
- Class: Conoidasida
- Order: Eucoccidiorida
- Family: Eimeriidae
- Genus: Isospora
- Species: I. ashmoonensis

Binomial name
- Isospora ashmoonensis Mohamad, 1995

Species of single-celled organism

Isospora ashmoonensis is a species of internal parasites classified under Coccidia. It was first identified in a blackcap in Egypt.
