= Karyolysus =

Scientific classification
- Domain: Eukaryota
- Clade: Sar
- Clade: Alveolata
- Phylum: Apicomplexa
- Class: Conoidasida
- Order: Eucoccidiorida
- Family: Karyolysidae
- Genus: Karyolysus

Species
- Karyolysus lacazei Karyolysus lacertae Karyolysus latus Karyolysus minor Karyolysus sonomae

Genus of single-celled organisms

Karyolysus is a genus of coccidia. With the exception of K. sonomae whose vertebrate host is the yellow-legged frog (Rana boylii boylii), species in this genus only infect lizards of the genus Lacerta.

== History ==
The genus was created by Labbe in 1894 for those species of sporozoans that fragmented the host nucleus. Reichenow in 1921 established that this property was of dubious taxonomic value. He proposed a different set of criteria for inclusion in this genus and these are the one currently in use.

The type species is Karyolysus lacertae .

== Characteristics of the genus ==
Schizogeny occurs in the endothelial cells

Gametogony occurs in the erythrocytes after their penetration by the merozoites.

Differentiation from the genus Haemogregarina may be difficult as in both genera gametocytogenesis occurs in the erythrocytes and have similar morphology. They can be distinguished on the location of schizogony: In Karyolysus this occurs in the endothelial cells of the visera while in Haemogregarina schizogony occurs in the bone marrow.

== Life cycle ==
Starting with infected mites which the host lizard ingests the veriform sporozoites are released from the sporocysts. These newly liberated sporozoites bore into the intestinal wall and enter the lymphatic vessels and the blood stream. On reaching the viscera and in particular the liver the sporozoites penetrate the endothelial cells. There they form ovoid schizonts within a membranous capsule. They remain in these cells for some time and give rise to 8 to 30 merozoites. The merozoites remain in the cell for some time before rupturing it and entering the blood stream.

On entering the blood stream the merozoites penetrate other endothelial cells. There they grow and undergo schizogeny producing a number of small merozoites. These second generation schizonts are smaller than the first generation and lack a discernable nucleus. These are also eventually released into the blood stream, this occurs usually day 42 post infection.

These small merozoites are actually gametocytes. These penetrate erythrocytes and differentiate into macrogametoctyes and microgametocytes. Both types are surrounded by a thin membrane. The microgametocytes remain thin and do not develop a nucleus. The macrogametocytes in contrast enlarge and develop a visible nucleus at one end of the nucleus.

On ingestion by a female mite (male mites do not require blood) the gametocytes are released from the erythrocytes. Within the gut they associate in spindle like pairs and enter the epithelial cells of the gut. Within the epithelial cell the macrogametocyte increases in size while the microgametocyte shrinks. The microgametocyte divides in two and one of the motile gametes so formed fuses with the macrogametocyte to form a zygote.

The zygote (or ookinete) grows within the cell and undergoes meiosis followed by several rounds of mitosis. The ookinte is now known as an oocyst. Within the oocyst the nuclei migrate to the surface of the oocyst and gather cytoplasm around them becoming known as sporoblasts. As they mature become vermicular in shape and are known as sporokinetes. These which are very active.

On release from the oocyst the sporokinetes migrate throughout the body of the mite. Some settle in the ovaries and enter the yolk of the eggs. Within the egg they develop a membrane and grow within this. This stage is known as the sporocyst. Within the sporocyst sporogony generates 20 to 30 sporozoites. These invade the developing nymph and enter the endodermal cells of the gut. On feeding some of the sporozoites enter the gut. Some remain within the gut while others exit in the faeces. When a lizard swallows the faeces or the mite which may be feeding on it the cycle begins again.

Hypnozoites are found in Karyolysus lacerate.

== Taxonomy ==
A study of the 18s rRNA suggests that this genus may overlap with Hepatozoon.

== Host records ==
K. sonomae - yellow legged frog (Rana boyli boyli)

== Hosts known to be infected but parasite species not reported ==
Lizard (Lacerta raddei nairensis)
