= Legerella =

Scientific classification
- Domain: Eukaryota
- Clade: Sar
- Clade: Alveolata
- Phylum: Apicomplexa
- Class: Conoidasida
- Order: Eucoccidiorida
- Family: Legerellidae
- Genus: Legerella; Mesnil, 1900

Species
- Legerella helminthorum Legerella hydropori Legerella nova Legerella parva Legerella testiculi

Genus of single-celled organisms

Legerella is a genus of parasitic alveolates of the phylum Apicomplexa. Species in this genus that usually infect the malpighian tubules of invertebrates.

Legerella helminthorum infects the intestinal cells of the nematode Mononchus composticola

Legerella testiculi infects the testes of the millipede Glomeris marginata.

The type species is Legerella nova.

== History ==
The genus was created by Félix Mesnil in 1900.

== Taxonomy ==
There are five species known in this genus.

== Description ==
The oocyst contains numerous sporozoites. Sporocysts do not occur.

== Host records ==
- L. helminthorum - nematode (Mononchus composticola)
- L. hydropori - beetle (Hydroporus palustris)
- L. testiculi - millipede (Glomeris marginata)
