= Isospora =

Scientific classification
- Domain: Eukaryota
- Clade: Sar
- Clade: Alveolata
- Phylum: Apicomplexa
- Class: Conoidasida
- Order: Eucoccidiorida
- Family: Eimeriidae
- Genus: Isospora; Schneider, 1881

Species
- I. almaataensis I. anseris I. ashmoonensis I. bahiensis I. bigemina I. bronchocelae I. buteonis I. buteonis I. cardellinae I. hammondi I. heydorni I. hominis I. mandari I. mejiro I. neorivolta I. peromysci I. rara I. ratti I. rivolta I. thibetana I. wallacei

Genus of single-celled organisms

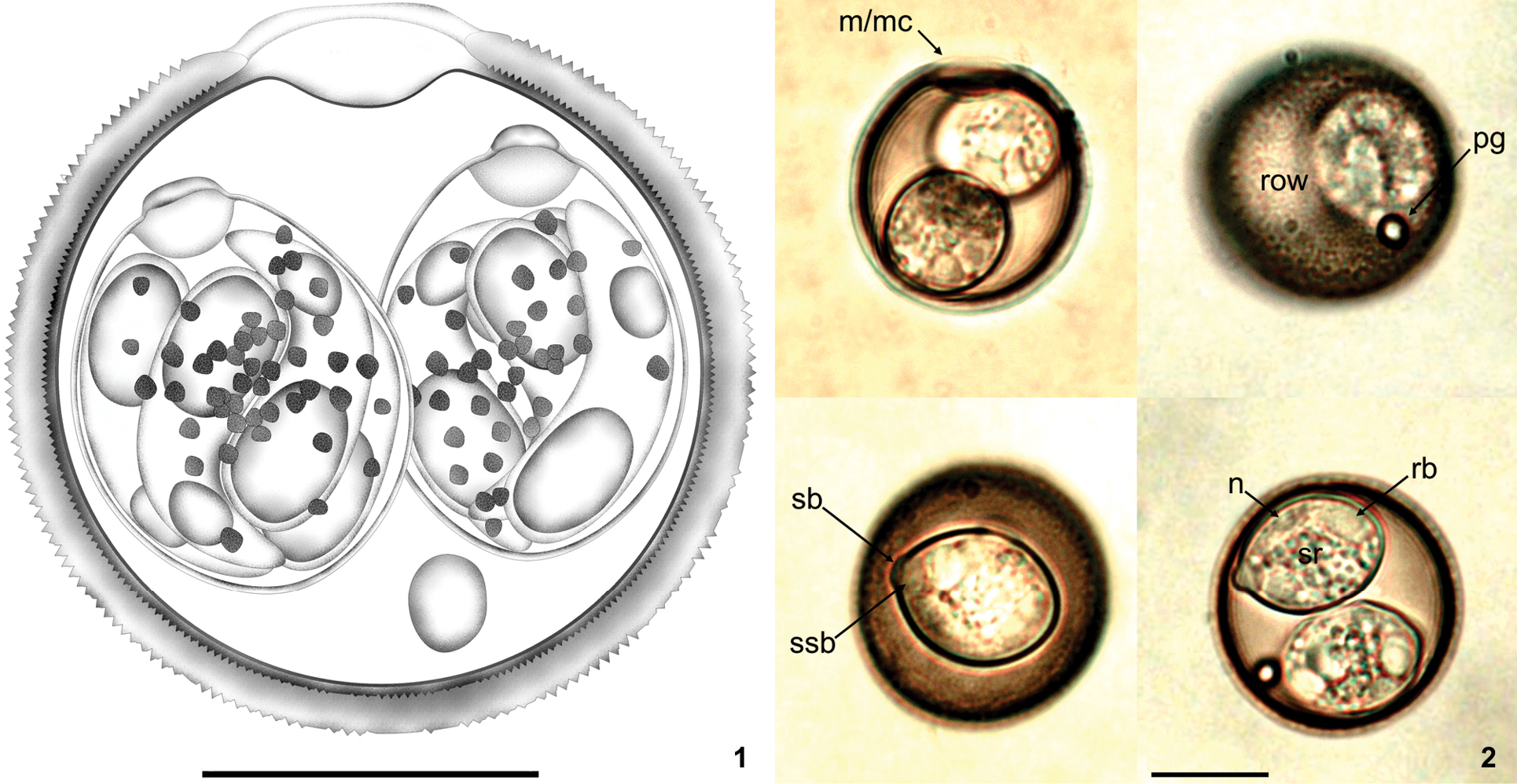
Figures 1–2; Sporulated oocysts of Isospora machadoae sp. nov. recovered from Turdus albicolis from Brazil: (1) line drawing; (2) photomicrographs. Note the micropyle and micropyle cap (m/mc), nucleus (n), polar granule (pg), refractile body (rb), rough oocyst wall (row), Stieda (sb) and sub-Stieda bodies (ssb) and the sporocyst residuum (sr). Scale bar = 10 μm.

Isospora is a genus of internal parasites in the subclass Coccidia.

It is responsible for the condition isosporiasis, which causes acute, non-bloody diarrhoea in immunocompromised individuals.

== Taxonomy ==
At least 248 species were originally described in this genus. For instance, the house sparrow has 12 species of Isospora. However, most species are little studied, and some authors doubt whether all should be recognized as distinct species. In 2005, all former Isospora species that infect mammalian hosts were reclassified as members of the genus Cystoisospora, a member of the Sarcocystidae family.
