= Octosporella (alveolate) =

Scientific classification
- Domain: Eukaryota
- Clade: Sar
- Superphylum: Alveolata
- Phylum: Apicomplexa
- Class: Conoidasida
- Order: Eucoccidiorida
- Family: Eimeriidae
- Genus: Octosporella; Ray & Raghavachari, 1942

Species
- Octosporella hystrix Octosporella mabuiae Octosporella notropis Octosporella opeongoensis Octosporella sanguinolentae Octosporella sasajewunensis

Genus of single-celled organisms

Octosporella is a genus in the phylum Apicomplexa. This genus has been poorly studied and little is known about it. Species in this genus infect fish, lizards and echidnas.

== History ==
This genus was created in 1942 by Ray and Raghavachari.

== Taxonomy ==
The type species is Octosporella mabuiae.

Six species are currently recognised.

== Description ==
The oocysts each have 8 sporocysts. Each sporocyst has 2 sporozoites.
