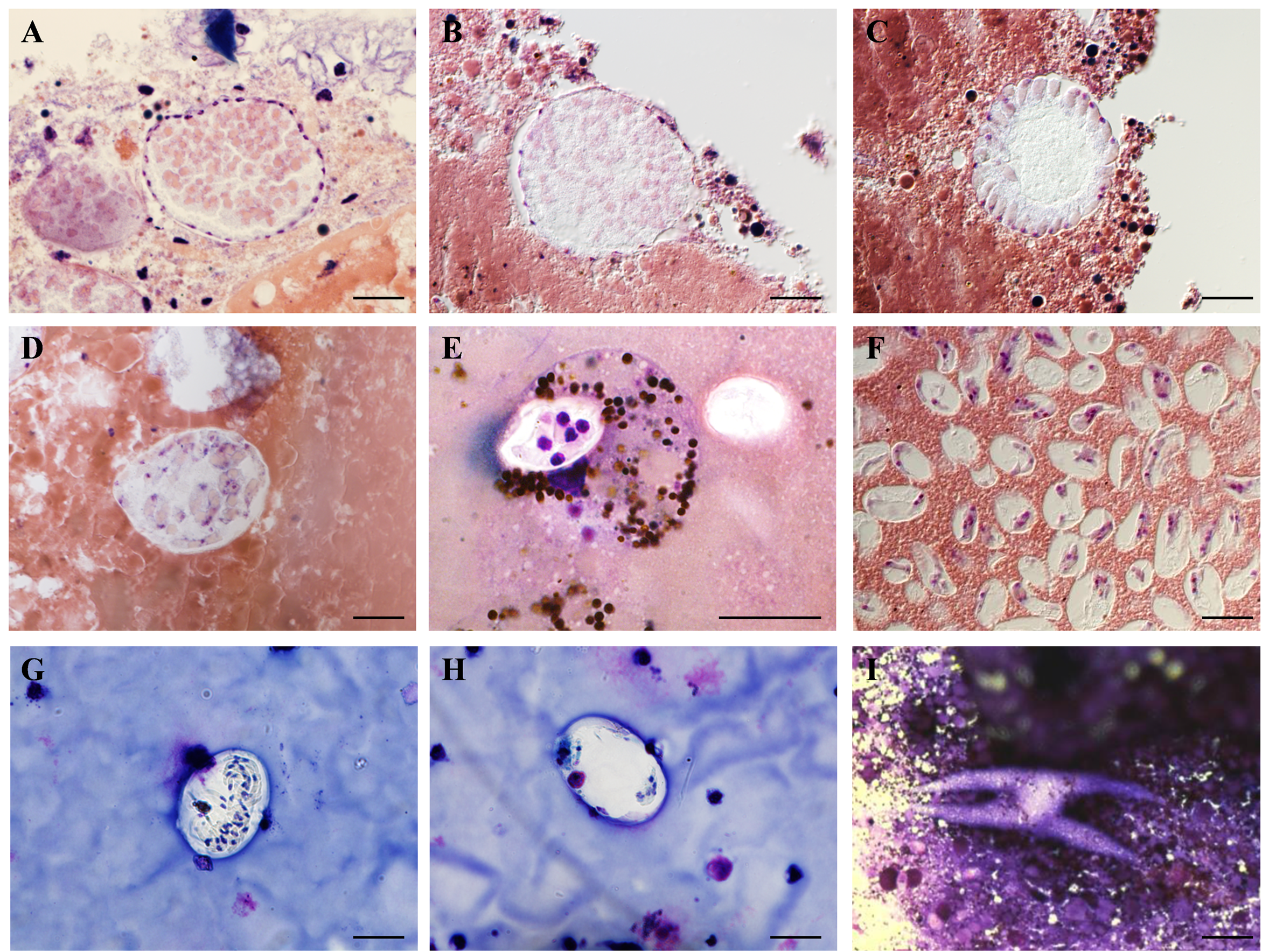

Scientific classification
- Domain: Eukaryota
- Clade: Sar
- Clade: Alveolata
- Phylum: Apicomplexa
- Class: Conoidasida
- Order: Eucoccidiorida
- Suborder: Adeleorina
- Family: Karyolysidae; Wenyon, 1926

Genera
- Hemolivia; Karyolysus

= Karyolysidae =

Family of single-celled organisms

Karyolysidae is a family of parasitic alveolates of the phylum Apicomplexa.
