= Mantonella =

Scientific classification
- Domain: Eukaryota
- Clade: Sar
- Superphylum: Alveolata
- Phylum: Apicomplexa
- Class: Conoidasida
- Order: Eucoccidiorida
- Family: Eimeriidae
- Genus: Mantonella; Vincent, 1936

Species
- Mantonella hammondi Mantonella meriones Mantonella peripati Mantonella podurae Mantonella potamobii

Genus of single-celled organisms

Mantonella is a genus in the phylum Apicomplexa.

This genus has been poorly studied and little is known about it.

The type species is Mantonella peripati

== History ==
This genus was created by Vincent in 1936. It was also recognised by Gousseff also in 1936 who proposed the name (synonym Yakimovella. The genus name Mantonella have been given precedence.

== Description ==
The oocysts each have one sporocyst. Each sporocyst has four sporozoites.

== Notes ==
Species from this genus have been described from vertebrates and invertebrates. It seems likely that at least some of the species described are not true species but rather pseudoparasites.
