= Orcheobius =

Scientific classification
- Domain: Eukaryota
- Clade: Sar
- Clade: Alveolata
- Phylum: Apicomplexa
- Class: Conoidasida
- Order: Eucoccidiorida
- Suborder: Adeleorina
- Family: Adeleidae
- Genus: Orcheobius; Schuberg & Kunze, 1906

Species
- Orcheobius carinii Orcheobius herpobdellae

Genus of single-celled organisms

Orcheobius is a genus of parasitic alveolates of the phylum Apicomplexa.

== History ==
The genus was created by Schuberg and Kunze in 1906.

The genus Cariniella was synonymised with Orcheobius by Levine in 1980.

== Taxonomy ==
There are two species known in this genus.

== Description ==
The oocysts have 25 or more sporocysts.

Each sporocyst produces 4 sporozoites.

The gamonts are elongated.

During syngny, four microgametes associate with the macrogamete. One microgamete penetrates the macrogamete and the remaining three die off.

== Host records ==
- O. carinii - frog (Leptodactylus ocellatus)
- O. herpobdellae - leech (Herpobdella atomaria)
