= Pythonella =

Scientific classification
- Domain: Eukaryota
- Clade: Sar
- Superphylum: Alveolata
- Phylum: Apicomplexa
- Class: Conoidasida
- Order: Eucoccidiorida
- Family: Eimeriidae
- Genus: Pythonella; Ray & Das-Gupta, 1937

Species
- Pythonella bengalensis Pythonella scelopori Pythonella scleruri

Genus of single-celled organisms

Pythonella is a genus of parasitic alveolates belonging to the phylum Apicomplexa. This genus was described by Ray and Das-Gupta in 1937.

The type species is Pythonella bengalensis.

== Taxonomy ==
This genus is very poorly studied with only three known species.

== Life cycle ==
This species infects the gastrointestinal tract of birds and reptiles. Its life cycle is very poorly known but it is thought that is spread by the orofaecal route.

The parasite infects the cells of the gut wall. There are 16 sporocysts per oocyst (heccaidesporocystid) with 4 sporozoites (tetrazoic) in each. Once shed from the body sporulation starts in 7 to 10 days.

Species in this genus have been isolated from Brazil, Costa Rica and India.

== Host records ==
- Pythonella bengalensis - Python species
- Pythonella scelopori - lizard
- Pythonella scleruri - rufous breasted leaftosser (Sclerurus scansor)
