= Chagasella =

Scientific classification
- Domain: Eukaryota
- Clade: Sar
- Clade: Alveolata
- Phylum: Apicomplexa
- Class: Conoidasida
- Order: Eucoccidiorida
- Suborder: Adeleorina
- Family: Adeleidae
- Genus: Chagasella; Machado 1912

Species
- Chagasella ganapatii Chagasella hartmanni

Genus of single-celled organisms

Chagasella is a genus of parasitic alveolates of the phylum Apicomplexa. Species in this genus infect insects of the order Hemiptera and of the family Termitoidae.

== Taxonomy ==
Two species are recognised in this genus.

== Description ==
The species in this genus are parasitic in arthropods.

These parasite appear to be spread via the orofaecal route and infect the gastrointestinal tract and salivary glands of the insect host. They form ovoid oocysts in the gut wall. There are three sporocysts per oocyte and 4-6 (possibly more) sporozoites per sporocyst. The merozoites are banana shaped. The spores are not confined by an oocyst membrane.

Gibbs in 1944 showed that after the first division of the zygote nucleus in the oocyst, only one of the two daughter nuclei divides. This differential division, by analogy with Adelina deronis, may indicate maleness for the nucleus that divided and femaleness for the one that does not.

== Host records ==
- Amitermes species
- Cenaeus carnifex
