= Gousseffia =

Scientific classification
- Domain: Eukaryota
- Clade: Sar
- Superphylum: Alveolata
- Phylum: Apicomplexa
- Class: Conoidasida
- Order: Eucoccidiorida
- Family: Eimeriidae
- Genus: Gousseffia; Levine & Ivens, 1979
- Species: G. erinacei

Binomial name
- Gousseffia erinacei (Gousseff, 1937)

Genus of single-celled organisms

Gousseffia is a genus of parasitic alveolates belonging to the phylum Apicomplexa.

This genus was originally named Yakimovella after the parasitologist Yakimoff. Levine in 1980 noted that this genus name was already in use and renamed the genus Gousseffia.

== Taxonomy ==
There is only one described species in this genus - Gousseffia erinacei.

== Life cycle ==
Little is known about this genus. It is presumably transmitted by the orofaecal route.

Each oocysts has 8 sporocysts. Each sporocyst has numerous sporozoites.

== Host records ==
This genus and species has been described in the European hedgehog (Erinaceus europaeus).

== History ==
This genus and species was described by Gousseff in 1937. It was renamed by Levine in 1980.
