= Protococcidiorida =

Scientific classification
- Domain: Eukaryota
- Clade: Sar
- Superphylum: Alveolata
- Phylum: Apicomplexa
- Class: Conoidasida
- Subclass: Coccidia
- Order: Protococcidiorida; Kheisin, 1956

Families
- Angeiocystidae; Eleutheroschizonidae; Grelliidae; Mackinnoniidae; Myriosporidae

Order of parasitic protozoa

Protococcidiorida is an order within the class Conoidasida of the phylum Apicomplexa. All members of this order are parasitic protozoa. The order was created by Kheisin in 1956.

The species in this order infect annelids.

There are five families and one additional genus (Sawayella) in this order.

== Life cycle ==
Both gamogony and sporogony is extracellular.

Merogony appears to be absent. The extracellular sporozoites develop directly into gamonts.

== Taxonomy ==
The family Grelliidae includes the genera Coelotropha and Grellia.

The family Angeiocystidae includes the genus Angeiocystis.
