= Diaspora (alveolate) =

Scientific classification
- Domain: Eukaryota
- (unranked): SAR
- (unranked): Alveolata
- Phylum: Apicomplexa
- Class: Conoidasida
- Order: Eucoccidiorida
- Suborder: Eimeriorina
- Family: Eimeriidae
- Genus: Diaspora Léger, 1898

Species
- Diaspora hydatidea

Genus of single-celled organisms

Diaspora is a genus in the phylum Apicomplexa, first described by Leger in 1898.

== Taxonomy ==
There is one species in this genus - Diaspora hydatidea. This species was isolated from a millipede (Polydesmus species)

This genus was created for those Eimeriidae whose oocysts are unknown but have sporocysts each containing a single sporozoite. As such it is poorly defined and may be revised in the future.
