= Skrjabinella =

Scientific classification
- Domain: Eukaryota
- Clade: Sar
- Superphylum: Alveolata
- Phylum: Apicomplexa
- Class: Conoidasida
- Order: Eucoccidiorida
- Family: Eimeriidae
- Genus: Skrjabinella

Species
- Skrjabinella mongolica

Genus of single-celled organisms

Skrjabinella is a genus of parasitic alveolates in the phylum Apicomplexa.

== History ==
This genus was created by Matschoulsky in 1949. The genus is named after the parasitologist Skrjabin.

== Taxonomy ==
There is currently only one species recognised in this genus - Skrjabinella mongolica.

== Life cycle ==
This species was isolated from the faeces of the jerboa (Allactaga saltator). Transmission is presumably by the orofaecal route but very little is known about this species.

== Description ==
The oocysts have 16 sporocysts, each with one sporozoite.
