= Hepatozoon massardii =

Scientific classification
- Domain: Eukaryota
- Clade: Diaphoretickes
- Clade: SAR
- Clade: Alveolata
- Phylum: Apicomplexa
- Class: Conoidasida
- Order: Eucoccidiorida
- Family: Hepatozoidae
- Genus: Hepatozoon
- Species: H. massardii

Binomial name
- Hepatozoon massardii O’Dwyer et al., 2013

Species of single-celled organism

Hepatozoon massardii is a species of alveolates known to infect snake species such as Crotalus durissus terrificus (rattlesnake).
