= Wenyonella =

Scientific classification
- Domain: Eukaryota
- Clade: Sar
- Superphylum: Alveolata
- Phylum: Apicomplexa
- Class: Conoidasida
- Order: Eucoccidiorida
- Family: Eimeriidae
- Genus: Wenyonella

Species
- Wenyonella africana Wenyonella ameivae Wenyonella anatis Wenyonella arcayae Wenyonella baghdadensis Wenyonella bahli Wenyonella columbae Wenyonella gagari Wenyonella gallinae Wenyonella hoarei Wenyonella levinei Wenyonella mackinnonae Wenyonella maligna Wenyonella markovi Wenyonella parva Wenyonella pellerdyi Wenyonella philiplevinei Wenyonella uelensis

Genus of single-celled organisms

Wenyonella is a genus of parasitic alveolates in the phylum Apicomplexa. The genus was described in 1933 by Hoare.

The type species is Wenyonella africana.

== Description ==
The species in this genus have oocysts with four sporocysts: each sporocyst gives rise to four sporozoites. They are found in the gastrointestinal tracts of reptiles, birds and mammals.
