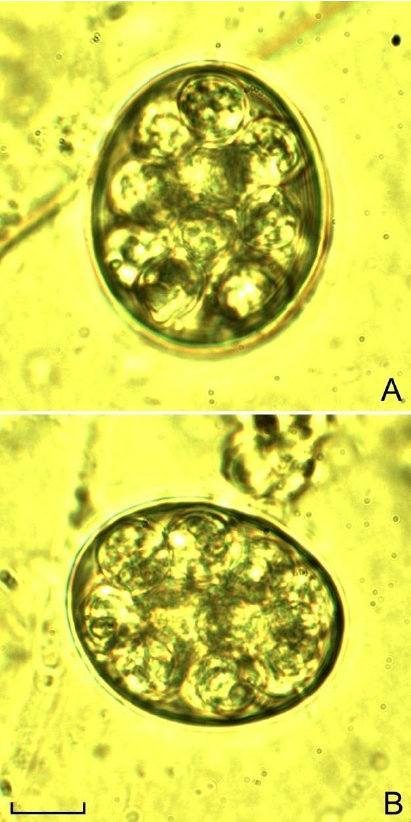
- Adelina sp.

Scientific classification
- Domain: Eukaryota
- Clade: Sar
- Clade: Alveolata
- Phylum: Apicomplexa
- Class: Conoidasida
- Order: Eucoccidiorida
- Family: Adeleidae
- Subfamily: Ithaniinae
- Genus: Adelina; Hesse

= Adelina (alveolate) =

Genus of single-celled organisms

Adelina is a genus of alveolates within the phylum Apicomplexa. They are coccidian parasites of arthropods and oligochaetes. Host orders include Coleoptera, Diptera, Collembola, Embioptera, Lepidoptera and Orthoptera.

== Taxonomy ==
The genus was created by Hesse in 1911 to accommodate a number of species within the genus Adelea that differed significantly: the sporocysts in Adelina are fewer in number than in Adelea and are spherical instead of being discoidal. The type species is Adelina octospora Hesse.

=== Species ===
- Adelina akidum Leger 1900
- Adelina collembolae Purrini 1984
- Adelina castana Ghosh, Choudhruy, Misra 2000
- Adelina cryptocerci Yarwood 1937
- Adelina domidiata Schneider 1885
- Adelina doronis Hauschka, 1943
- Adelina melolonthae Tuzet et al 1965
- Adelina mesnili Perez 1903
- Adelina octospora Hesse 1911
- Adelina palori Ghosh, Choudhruy, Misra 2000
- Adelina picei Ghosh, Choudhruy, Misra 2000
- Adelina riouxi Levine 1977
- Adelina schellacki Ray and Dasgupta 1937
- Adelina sericesthis Weiser and Beard 1959
- Adelina simplex Schneider 1885
- Adelina tenebrionis Sautet 1930
- Adelina tipulae Leger 1897
- Adelina transita Leger 1904
- Adelina tribolii Bhatia 1937
- Adelina zonula Moroff 1906

== Description ==
Members of this genus have spherical or subspherical oocysts. The sporocysts are spherical and thick-walled.
