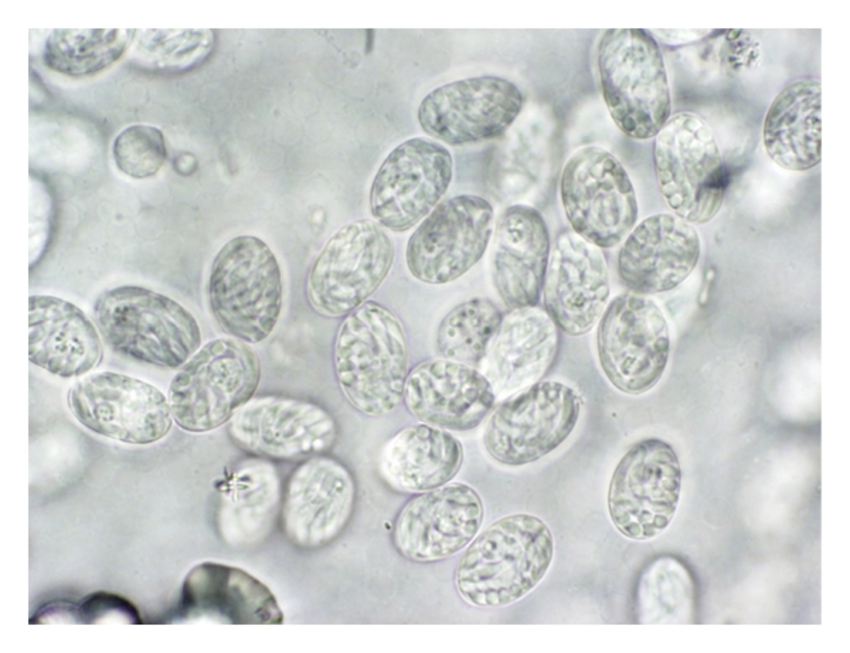
- Klossiella equi

Scientific classification
- Domain: Eukaryota
- Supergroup: Alveolata
- Phylum: Apicomplexa
- Class: Conoidasida
- Order: Eucoccidiorida
- Suborder: Adeleorina
- Family: Klossiellidae; Smith & Johnson, 1902
- Genus: Klossiella; Smith & Johnson, 1902

Species
- Klossiella bettongiae Klossiella beveridgei Klossiella boae Klossiella callitris Klossiella cobayae Klossiella equi Klossiella hydromyos Klossiella killicki Klossiella mabokensis Klossiella muris Klossiella quimrensis Klossiella rufogrisei Klossiella rufi Klossiella schoinobatis Klossiella serendipensis Klossiella tejerai Klossiella thylogale

= Klossiella =

Genus of single-celled organisms

Klossiella is a genus of parasitic alveolates of the phylum Apicomplexa. Species in this genus infect the renal tract of mammals and intestinal tract of snakes.

The type species is Klossiella muris.

== History ==
The first member of this genus was identified by Theobald Smith in 1889 in the kidney of a white mouse. An expanded study of this parasite was later published by Smith and Johnson in 1902 where they suggested the name Klossiella muris.

In 1975 Australian scientists I. Barker, B. Munday, and K. Harrigan analyzed the kidneys from 137 peramelid, petaurid, and macropodid marsupials. 4 new Klossiella sp. were discovered: K. quimrensis, K. convolutor, K. serendipensis, and K. callitris.

In 1985, the same Australian scientists I. Barker and B. Munday worked with a third scientist, W. Hartley, to analyze more petaurid and macropodid marsupials for Klossiella. 6 new species were discovered: K. rufogrisei, K. rufi, K. thylogale, K. beveridgei, K. bettongiae, and K. schoinobatis.

== Taxonomy ==
Currently there are 17 species recognized in this genus. All except one (Klossiella boae) infect the renal tracts of mammals.

== Description ==
This genus is unusual in having only a single host in its life cycle.

The parasite is ingested and within the gut sporozoites escape from the sporocyst and invade the blood stream. Upon reaching the kidney, within the epithelium of the kidney the sporozoite undergoes merogony followed by gametogony and sporogony. It produces polysporocystic oocysts without a resistant oocyst wall. The resistant sporocysts are then shed in the urine.

The oocysts are subspherical, smooth and measure 22-24 μm by 20-21 μm.

== Clinical ==
K. boae occurs both in the intestine and the kidney of the boa constrictor. It may cause anorexia, restlessness, hemorrhagic enteritis and intussusception.

== Host records ==
- K. bettongiae - Tasmanian bettong (Bettongia gaimardi)
- K. beveridgei - spectacled hare-wallaby (Lagorchestes conspicillatus)
- K. boae - boa constrictor (Boa constrictor)
- K. callitris - western grey kangaroo (Macropus fuliginosus)
- K. cobayae - guinea pig (Cavia porcellus)
- K. dulcis n.sp. - sugar glider (Petaurus breviceps)
- K. equi - horse (Equus ferus caballus)
- K. hydromyos - Australian water rat (Hydromys chrysogaster)
- K. mabokensis - African murid (Praomys jsoni)
- K. muris - mouse (Mus musculus)
- K. quimrensis - western barred bandicoot (Perameles bougainville)
- K. rufi - red kangaroo (Macropus rufus)
- K. rufogrisei - Bennett's wallaby (Macropus rufogriseus)
- K. schoinobatis - petaurid greater glider (Petauroides volans)
- K. serendipensis - swamp wallaby (Wallabia bicolor)
- K. tejerai - opossum (Didelphis marsupialis)
- K. thylogale - Tasmanian pademelon (Thylogale billardierii)

=== Note ===
This genus has also been found in the kidneys of bats but the species was not identified.
