= Ganapatiella =

Scientific classification
- Domain: Eukaryota
- Clade: Diaphoretickes
- Clade: SAR
- Clade: Alveolata
- Phylum: Apicomplexa
- Class: Conoidasida
- Order: Eucoccidiorida
- Family: Adeleidae
- Genus: Ganapatiella; Kalavati, 1977
- Species: G. odontotermi

Binomial name
- Ganapatiella odontotermi Kalavati, 1977

Genus of single-celled organisms

Ganapatiella is a genus of parasitic alveolates of the phylum Apicomplexa.

The genus was created by Kalavati in 1977.

== Taxonomy ==
There is one species known in this genus, Ganapatiella odontotermi.

== Description ==
This species is found in the fat body of the termite (Odontotermes obesus).

The oocysts contain many sporocysts, each of which encloses 2 sporozoites.

Instead of the usual 1–4, eight microgametes from each microgamont during syzygy.
