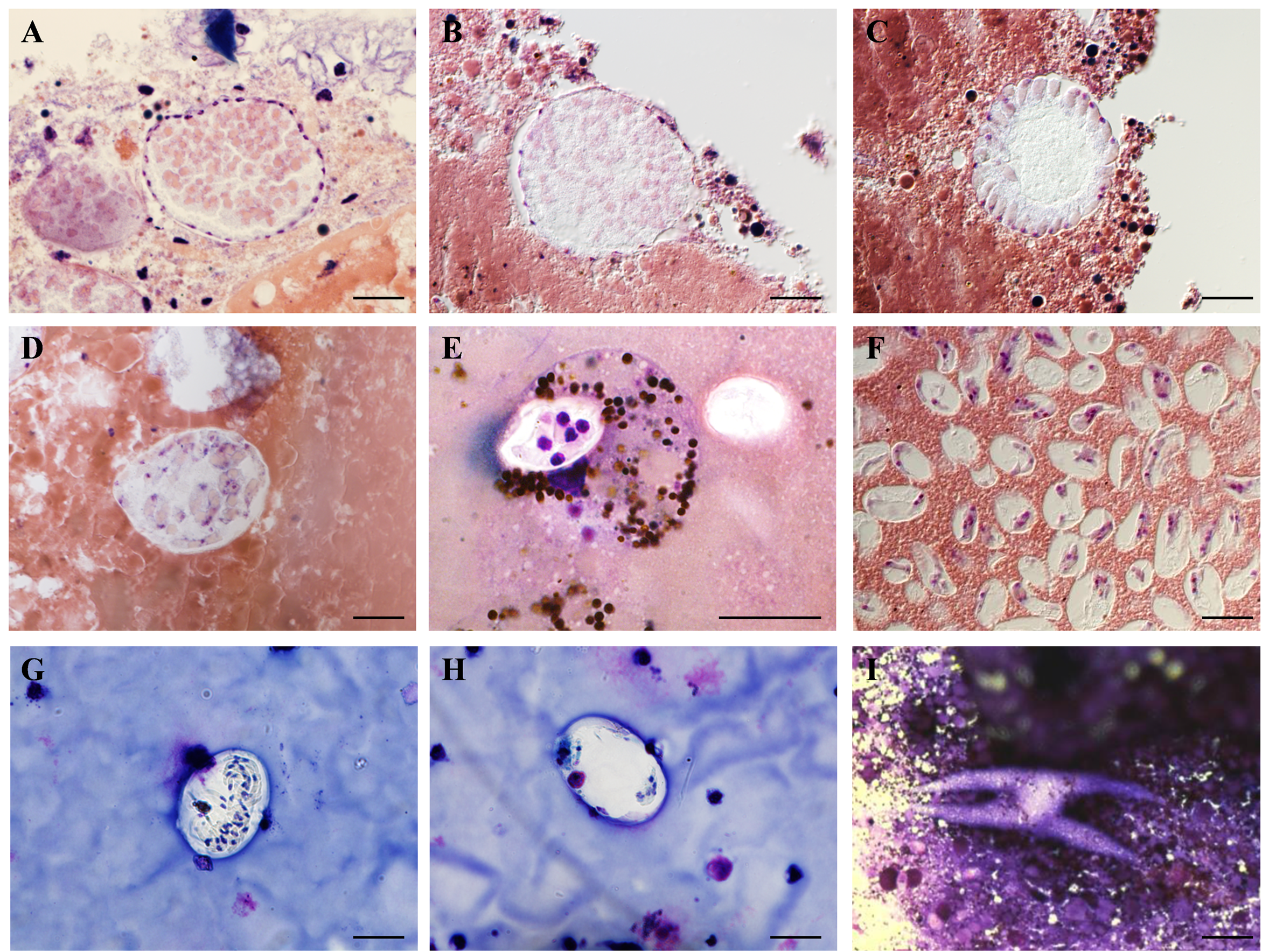
- Hemolivia argantis (A–H) and Hemolivia stellata (I) in their invertebrate hosts

Scientific classification
- Domain: Eukaryota
- Clade: Sar
- Clade: Alveolata
- Phylum: Apicomplexa
- Class: Conoidasida
- Order: Eucoccidiorida
- Family: Karyolysidae
- Genus: Hemolivia

Species
- Hemolivia mariae Hemolivia mauritanica Hemolivia stellata

= Hemolivia =

Genus of single-celled organisms

Hemolivia (also spelled Haemolivia) is a genus of the phylum Apicomplexa.

== History ==
This genus was described in 1990 by Petit et al.

The type species is Hemolivia stellata. Molecular data on H. stellata were provided in 2015 by Karadjian, Chavatte and Landau, from a 25-year-old archived smear of crushed tick (Amblyomma rotondatum).

Hepatozoon argantis Garnham, 1954 was reassigned to Hemolivia as Hemolivia argantis (Garnham, 1954) Karadjian, Chavatte and Landau, 2015.

== Characteristics of the genus ==
The species in this genus are haemogregarines and infect exothermic vertebrates. They have erythrocytic gamogony, both erythrocytic and extra-erythrocytic merogony and cystogony. The definitive hosts are ixodid ticks.

Sporogony occurs in two phases. In the first phase conjugation and fertilization occur within the tick gut. This is followed by the formation of oocysts and the generation of sporokinetes. In the second phase the sporokinetes invade the body of the tick and give rise to sporocysts containing sporozoites infective to the vertebrate host.

Živčicová et al. (2024) considered that the uniform morphology of the most common blood stages of species of the genus Hemolivia complicates their differential diagnosis. They described, however, a new species, Hemolivia pulcherrima Živčicová, Kvičerová & Široký, 2024.

== Life cycle ==
The vertebrate host of this species is the cane toad (Bufo marinus). The invertebrate host is the tick Amblyomma rotondatum.

Toads become infected by ingesting infected ticks. The sporozoites are released from the sporocysts within the tick and penetrate the intestinal wall. Within the toad they replicate within the endothelial cells and erythrocytes. Liver cysts may form.

Circulating gamonts are then ingested by a tick. Within the tick gut the gamonts form pairs and penetrate the epithelial cells. Within these cells they associate in syzygy. Gametes are formed and fuse forming an oocyst. The oocysts are star shaped. The oocyst undergoes meiosis and then mitosis producing numerous sporozoites.

These sporozoites invade the body of the tick, undergo merogony and giving rise to many merozoites which are infective for the toad.

== Host records ==
H. mariae - blue-tongued skink (Tiliqua rugosa)

H. mauritanica - Greek tortoise (Testudo graeca), marginated tortoise (Testudo marginata), Testudo mauritanica

H. stellata - teiid lizard (Ameiva ameiva), cane toad (Bufo marinus)

== Vectors ==
H. mariae - Amblyomma limbatum

H. mauritanica - Hyalomma aegyptium

H. stellata - Amblyomma rotondatum.
