= Klossiella quimrensis =

Scientific classification
- Domain: Eukaryota
- Supergroup: Alveolata
- Phylum: Apicomplexa
- Class: Conoidasida
- Order: Eucoccidiorida
- Family: Klossiellidae
- Genus: Klossiella
- Species: K. quimrensis

Binomial name
- Klossiella quimrensis Barker, Munday & Harrigan, 1975

Parasite of the western barred bandicoot

Klossiella quimrensis is a parasite of an Australian marsupial: the western barred bandicoot (Perameles bougainville). It causes renal coccidiosis in its host.

Its specific name, quimrensis (Latin for ‘of QIMR’), refers to the Queensland Institute of Medical Research, where it was first observed.

== See also ==
Other species with acronym names:

- AEECL's sportive lemur
- Apterichtus ansp
- GERP's mouse lemur
- Turbonilla musorstom
