= Tyzzeria =

Scientific classification
- Domain: Eukaryota
- Clade: Sar
- Clade: Alveolata
- Phylum: Apicomplexa
- Class: Conoidasida
- Order: Eucoccidiorida
- Family: Eimeriidae
- Genus: Tyzzeria

Species
- Tyzzeria allenae Tyzzeria anseris Tyzzeria boae Tyzzeria chalcides Tyzzeria chenicusae Tyzzeria galli Tyzzeria natrix Tyzzeria parvula Tyzzeria pellerdyi Tyzzeria peomysci Tyzzeria perdyi Tyzzeria perniciosa Tyzzeria typhlopis

Genus of single-celled organisms

Tyzzeria is a genus of parasitic alveolates that with one exception (Tyzzeria boae) infect the cells of the small intestine.

== History ==
The genus Tyzzeria was first described by Allen in 1936.

As is all too common in protozoal taxonomy the validity of several of the species is controversial. Species occurring in Anseriforme birds appear to be valid whereas the other species may be misidentifications. The application of DNA based methods it is to be hoped will resolve these matters.

== Description ==
The oocysts lack sporocysts: each oocyst possesses eight sporozoites.

== Host-parasite relations ==
Tyzzeria allenae - common goldeneye (Chenicus coromandelianus)
Tyzzeria boae - red tailed boa (Boa constrictor constrictor)
Tyzzeria chalcides - ocellated skink (Chalcides ocellatus)
Tyzzeria chenicusae - common goldeneye (Chenicus coromandelianus)
Tyzzeria galli - Ceylon jungle fowl (Gallus lafayettei)
Tyzzeria natrix - yamakagashi (Rhabdophis tigrinus)
Tyzzeria parvula - greater white-fronted goose (Anser albifrons), greylag goose (Anser anser), snow goose (Anser caerulescens), Ross' goose (Anser rossii), brent goose (Branta bernicla), Canada goose (Branta canadensis), tundra swan (Cygnus columbianus)
Tyzzeria pellerdyi - northern pintail (Anas acuta), American wigeon (Anas americana), northern shoveler (Anas clypeata), common teal (Anas crecca), blue-winged teal (Anas discors), mallard (Anas platyrhynchos), gadwall (Anas strepera), ferruginous duck (Aythya nyroca)
Tyzzeria perniciosa - northern pintail (Anas acutus), mallard (Anas platyrhynchos), lesser scaup (Anas affinis), lesser white-fronted goose (Aythya erythropus), tufted duck (Aythya fuligule), white-headed duck (Oxyura leucocephala), common shelduck (Tadorna tadora)
Tyzzeria peomysci - white-footed mouse (Peromyscus leucopus), deer mouse 'Peromyscus maniculatus)
Tyzzeria perniciosa - lesser scaup (Aythya affinis)
Tyzzeria typhlopis - European blind snake (Typhlops vermicularis)
