= Dactylosoma =

Scientific classification
- Domain: Eukaryota
- Clade: Sar
- Clade: Alveolata
- Phylum: Apicomplexa
- Class: Conoidasida
- Order: Eucoccidiorida
- Family: Dactylosomatidae
- Genus: Dactylosoma; Labbé, 1894

Species
- Dactylosoma hannesi Dactylosoma jahni Dactylosoma lethrinorum Dactylosoma mariae Dactylosoma notopterae Dactylosoma piperis Dactylosoma ranarum (type-species); Dactylosoma salvelini Dactylosoma splendens Dactylosoma sylvatica Dactylosoma taiwanensis

Genus of single-celled organisms

Dactylosoma is a genus of parasitic alveolates of the phylum Apicomplexa.

Species in this genus have two hosts in their life cycle: the vertebrate host is a fish or amphibian (possibly also reptiles) and the invertebrate host is a glossiphoniid leech (Glossiphoniidae).

== Taxonomy ==
This genus was described by Labbé in 1894. The type species is Dactylosoma ranarum (Kruse, 1890). A species close to Dactylosoma ranarum, and parasite of the same hosts as the type-species, i.e. Pelophylax water frogs, was investigated in detail in 2026 by morphological and molecular methods.

== Description ==
Merogony: Schizonts in this genus produce 6 to 16 merozoites by simultaneous exogenous budding. These typically are found in a fan shaped arrangement. This occurs within the erythrocytes.

Secondary merogony produces 6 smaller merozoites that are destined to become intraerythrocytic gamonts.

Gametogony: The gametocytes are larger, elongated forms derived from some of the merozoites

Oocysts are formed after fertilization in the leech intestine. 30 or more sporozoites are produced by exogenous budding directly in the cytoplasm of the intestinal epithelial cells. No oocyst wall is formed.

== Species ==
Úngari et al. (2020) recognised six species of Dactylosoma known globally. Two of these are described from fish hosts, and the remaining four species from anuran hosts, namely Dactylosoma ranarum (Kruse, 1890) described from the European frog Pelophylax kl. esculentus; Dactylosoma sylvatica Fanthan, Porter and Richardson, 1942 reported in Lithobates sylvatica from Quebec, Canada; Dactylosoma taiwanensis Manwell, 1964 described infecting Fejervarya limnocharis collected in Taiwan; and Dactylosoma kermiti described infecting the anurans, Ptychadena anchietae and Sclerophrys gutturalis from South Africa. Dactylosoma piperis was described in 2020 from the pepper frog Leptodactylus labyrinthicus (Anura, Leptodactylidae) from Mato Grosso State, Brazil.
