= Desseria =

Scientific classification
- Domain: Eukaryota
- Supergroup: Alveolata
- Phylum: Apicomplexa
- Class: Conoidasida
- Order: Eucoccidiorida
- Suborder: Adeleorina
- Family: Haemogregarinidae
- Genus: Desseria

Genus of single-celled organisms

Desseria is a genus of parasitic alveolates belonging to the phylum Apicomplexa. The genus was described in 1995. The species in this genus were previously considered to belong to the genus Haemogregarina.

The species in this genus infect fish. Approximately 40 species are recognised in this genus currently.

== Host records ==
- Desseria acanthoclini Laird 1953 - Acanthoclinus quadridactylus.
- Desseria acipenseri Nawrotsky 1914 - Acipenser ruthenis.
- Desseria aeglefini Henry 1913 - Gadus morhua, Melanogrammus aeglefinus, Pollachius virens, Urophysis species
- Desseria anarhichadis Henry 1912 - Anarhichas lupus
- Desseria bettencourti Franca 1908 - Anguilla species
- Desseria bothi Lebailly 1905 - Bothus rhombus
- Desseria brevoortiae Saunders 1964 - Brevoortia tyrannus
- Desseria carpionis Franchini & Siani, 1923 - Cyprinus carpio
- Desseria catostomi Becker 1962 - Catostomus species
- Desseria colisa Mandal et al 1983 - Colisa fasciatus
- Desseria cotti Brumpt & Lebailly 1904 - Cottus species
- Desseria cyprini Smirnova 1971 - Cyprinus carpio
- Desseria dakarensis Leger & Leger, 1920 - Diagramma mediterraneum
- Desseria dasyatis Saunders 1958 - Dasyatis americanus
- Desseria esocis Nawrotsky 1914 - Esox species
- Desseria flesi Lebailly 1904 - Flesus vulgaris
- Desseria fragilis Fantham 1930 - Blennius cornutus
- Desseria gilbertia Mackerras & Mackerras 1925 - Ellerkeldia species
- Desseria gobionis Franchini & Siani 1923 - Gobio fluviatilis
- Desseria heterodonti von Prowazek 1910 - Heterodontus japonicus
- Desseria irkalukpiki Laird 1961 - Salvelinus species
- Desseria laternae Lebailly 1904 - Platophrys laternae
- Desseria lepidosirensis Jepps 1927 - Lepidosiren paradoxa
- Desseria leptocotti Hill & Hendrickson 1991 - Leptocottus armatus, Sebastes melanops
- Desseria londoni Yakimov & Kohl-Yakimov 1912 - Blennius trigloides
- Desseria mavori Laird & Bullock 1969 - Macrozoarces americanus
- Desseria moringa Pessoa & de Biasi 1975 - Gymnothorax moringa
- Desseria mugili Carini 1932 - Mugil species, Awaous ocellaris, Stenogobius genivittatus
- Desseria myoxocephali Fantham et al 1942 - Euhirudinea, Malmiana scorpii, Myoxocephalus species
- Desseria nili Wenyon 1909 - Ophriocephalus obscurus
- Desseria ninakohlyakimovae Yakimov 1916 - Barbus species
- Desseria nototheniiae Barber et al 1987 - Notothenia species
- Desseria parasiluri Bykhovskaya-Pavlovskaya et al 1962 - Parasilurus asotus
- Desseria platessae Lebailly, 1904 - Trinectes maculatus, Glyptocephalus cynoglossus, Paralichthys dentatus, Pleuronectes platessa, Pseudopleuronectes americanus, Scopthalmus aquosus
- Desseria rovignensis Minchin & Woodcock 1910 - Trigla lineata.
- Desseria rubrimarensis Saunders, 1960 - Acanthurus species, Chlorus species, Scarus species
- Desseria salvelini Fantham et al 1942 - Salvelinus fontinalis
- Desseria thyrosoideae de Mello & Valles 1936 - Thyrosoidea macrurus
- Desseria tilapiae LŽger & LŽger 1914 - Tilapia lata
- Desseria torpedinis Neumann 1909 - Torpedo species
- Desseria turkestanica Yakimov & Shorkhor 1917 - Silurus species

== Synonyms ==
- Desseria acipenseri - Leucocytogregarina species Perekropov 1928
- Desseria aeglefini - Haemogregarina urophysis Fantham, Porter & Richardson 1942
- Desseria anarhichadis - Haemogregarina anarrhichabis Henry 1912
- Desseria cotti - Haemogregarina cotti Bauer 1948; H. baueri Becker 1968
- Desseria lepidosirensis - Haemogregarina bertoni Shouten 1941
- Desseria leptocotti - Haemogregarina reolofsi Hill & Hendrickson 1991
- Desseria ninakohlyakimovae - Haemogregarina ninakohlyakimovae Yakimov 1916, Wenyon 1926 emend. Levine 1985; Leucocytogregarina ninae kohl-yakimovae Yakimov 1916; L. ninae kohl-yakimovi Yakimov 1917; Leucocytozoon ninae kohl-yakimovae Yakimov 1917; Hepatozoon ninae kohl-yakimoff Yakimov 1916, Bykhovskaya-Pavlovskaya et al 1962
- Desseria platessae - Haemogregarina achiri Saunders 1955
- Desseria torpedinis - Haemogregarina lobianci Kohl-Yakimov & Yakimov 1912
