= Dorisiella =

Scientific classification
- Domain: Eukaryota
- Clade: Sar
- Clade: Alveolata
- Phylum: Apicomplexa
- Class: Conoidasida
- Order: Eucoccidiorida
- Family: Caryotrophidae
- Genus: Dorisiella; Ray, 1930
- Species: D. scolelepidis

Binomial name
- Dorisiella scolelepidis Ray, 1930

Genus of single-celled organisms

Dorisiella is a genus of parasitic alveolates belonging to the phylum Apicomplexa. This genus was created in 1930 by Ray.

== Taxonomy ==
Currently there is only one species recognised in this genus.

== Life cycle ==
This species infects the gastrointestinal tract of polychaete worms. It is not known if it has any other host.

The parasite infects the cells of the gut wall. The oocysts have thin membrane like walls. Each sporocyst gives rise to 8 sporozoites

== Host records ==
Malacoceros fuliginosus. This worm of the family Spionidae was previously known as Scolelepis fuliginosa. This name is now recognised as a junior synonym.
