= Klossia =

Klossia is the scientific name of two genera of organisms and may refer to:

- Klossia (alveolate), a genus of apicomplexans in the family Adeleidae
- Klossia (plant), a genus of plants in the family Rubiaceae
