= Gibbsia archiuli =

Scientific classification
- Domain: Eukaryota
- Supergroup: Alveolata
- Phylum: Apicomplexa
- Class: Conoidasida
- Order: Eucoccidiorida
- Family: Adeleidae
- Genus: Gibbsia; Levine 1986
- Species: G. archiuli

Binomial name
- Gibbsia archiuli Levine 1986

Species of single-celled organism

Gibbsia is a genus of parasitic alveolates of the phylum Apicomplexa.

There is only one species known in this genus, Gibbsia archiuli.

== Taxonomy ==
This genus was created by Levine for a species of protozoa that was discovered by Gibbs in 1952.

== Description ==
The only known species in this genus was found in South Africa. It infects the garden millipede (Archiulus moreleti).
