= Cyrilia =

Scientific classification
- Domain: Eukaryota
- Clade: Sar
- Clade: Alveolata
- Phylum: Apicomplexa
- Class: Conoidasida
- Order: Eucoccidiorida
- Family: Haemogregarinidae
- Genus: Cyrilia; Lainson, 1981

Species
- Cyrilia gomesi Neiva & Pinto 1926; Cyrilia lignieresi Laveran 1906; Cyrilia nili Wenyon 1909; Cyrilia uncinata

Genus of single-celled organisms

Cyrilia is a genus of parasitic alveolates in the phylum Apicomplexa. The genus was created by Lainson in 1981. Species in this genus primarily infect freshwater fish and are transmitted by leeches.

== Host relations ==
- C. nili - African catfish (Clarias lazera), Nile tilapia (Tilapia nilotica)

== Vectors ==
- C. nili - African fish leech (Batracobdelloides tricarinata Blanchard 1897)
