= Nimbus hoberlandti =

Scientific classification
- Kingdom: Animalia
- Phylum: Arthropoda
- Clade: Pancrustacea
- Class: Insecta
- Order: Coleoptera
- Suborder: Polyphaga
- Infraorder: Scarabaeiformia
- Family: Scarabaeidae
- Genus: Nimbus
- Species: N. hoberlandti

Binomial name
- Nimbus hoberlandti (Tesař, 1945)

Synonyms
- Aphodius (Nimbus) hoberlandti Tesař, 1945

Species of beetle

Nimbus hoberlandti is a species of beetle of the family Scarabaeidae. It is found in Austria, the Czech Republic and Russia.

== Description ==
Adults reach a length of about 7 mm (0.28 in). They are very similar to Nimbus affinis, but they have coarser punctation, the disc of the pronotum is completely smooth at the base and the intervals on the elytra are smooth at the base.
