= Nimbus libanonensis =

Scientific classification
- Kingdom: Animalia
- Phylum: Arthropoda
- Clade: Pancrustacea
- Class: Insecta
- Order: Coleoptera
- Suborder: Polyphaga
- Infraorder: Scarabaeiformia
- Family: Scarabaeidae
- Genus: Nimbus
- Species: N. libanonensis

Binomial name
- Nimbus libanonensis (Petrovitz, 1958)

Synonyms
- Aphodius (Nimbus) libanonensis Petrovitz, 1958

Species of beetle

Nimbus libanonensis is a species of beetle of the family Scarabaeidae. It is found in Lebanon, Syria and Turkey.

== Description ==
Adults reach a length of about 4.3–6 mm (0.17–0.24 in). They are very similar to Nimbus contaminatus, but smaller and there is a dark spot at the base of the 5th interval.
