= Babesiosoma =

Scientific classification
- Domain: Eukaryota
- Clade: Sar
- Clade: Alveolata
- Phylum: Apicomplexa
- Class: Conoidasida
- Order: Eucoccidiorida
- Family: Dactylosomatidae
- Genus: Babesiosoma; Jakowska and Nigrelli, 1956

Species
- Babesiosoma bettencourti Babesiosoma jahni Babesiosoma mariae Babesiosoma ophicephali Babesiosoma scombri Babesiosoma stableri Babesiosoma tetragonis

Genus of single-celled organisms

Babesiosoma is a genus of parasitic alveolates in the phylum Apicomplexa.

They have two hosts in their life cycle: the vertebrate hosts are fish and the invertebrate vectors are leeches.

This genus has been poorly studied and little is known about it.

== History ==
The genus was created in 1956 by Jakowska and Nigrelli.

Seven species have been recognised in this genus.
