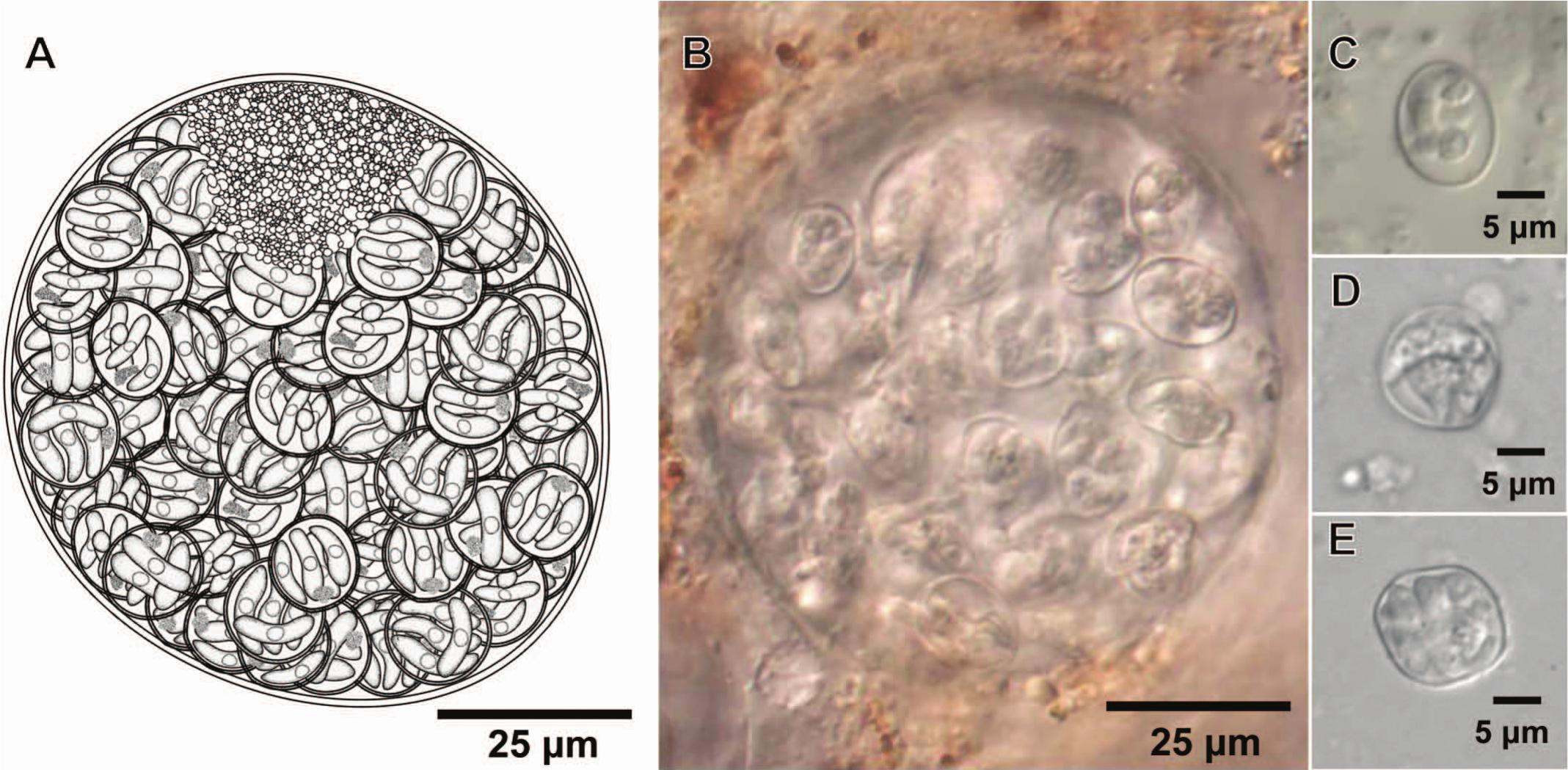
- Klossia razorbacki

Scientific classification
- Domain: Eukaryota
- Clade: Sar
- Clade: Alveolata
- Phylum: Apicomplexa
- Class: Conoidasida
- Order: Eucoccidiorida
- Suborder: Adeleorina
- Family: Adeleidae
- Genus: Klossia; Schneider 1875

Species
- Klossia aphodii Klossia chitonis Klossia dimidiata Klossia dorsenna Klossia eberthi Klossia helicina Klossia lanisina Klossia macrocoronata Klossia montana Klossia musabaevae Klossia octopiana Klossia pachyleparon Klossia sepiana Klossia tellinae

= Klossia (alveolate) =

Genus of single-celled organisms

Klossia is a genus of parasitic alveolates of the phylum Apicomplexa.

== History ==
The genus was created by Schneider in 1875.

== Taxonomy ==
The type species is Klossia helicina Schneider, 1875

== Description ==
These species are generally found in molluscs.

Klossia alone among Coccidiidae has a distinct cell membrane.

The gamonts are spherical.

== Host records ==
- K. aphodii - Aphodius contaminatus, Aphodius fimetarius
- K. eberthi - Sepia species
- K. helicina - snail (Cepaea nemoralis)
- K. pachyleparon - monitor lizard (Varanus nebulosus)
