= Ixorheis =

Scientific classification
- Domain: Eukaryota
- Clade: Sar
- Clade: Alveolata
- Phylum: Apicomplexa
- Class: Conoidasida
- Order: Ixorheorida
- Family: Ixorheidae
- Genus: Ixorheis
- Species: I. psychropotae

Binomial name
- Ixorheis psychropotae Massin, Jangoux & Sibuet, 1978

Genus of single-celled organisms

Ixorheis is a genus of parasitic alveolates in the phylum Apicomplexa.

== Taxonomy ==
This species and genus were described in 1978 by Massin, Jangoux and Sibuet.

The order and family were created by Levine in 1984.

Ixoreis psychropotae is currently the only known species in genus Ixorheis, family Ixorheidae and order Ixorheorida.

== History ==
The species was isolated from the digestive tract of the sea cucumber Psychropotes longicauda.

== Description ==
This species has been reported only once and little is known about it.

Gametogony is absent but both merogony and sporogony occur.
