= Eleutheroschizonidae =

Scientific classification
- Domain: Eukaryota
- Clade: Sar
- Superphylum: Alveolata
- Phylum: Apicomplexa
- Class: Conoidasida
- Order: Protococcidiorida
- Genus: Eleutheroschizonidae; Chatton & Villeneuve, 1936

Genera
- Coelotropha; Defretinella; Eleutheroschizon

Family of single-celled organisms

Eleutheroschizonidae is a family of parasites in the order Protococcidiorida. There are three genera currently recognised in this family. All species in this family infect annelids.

The family was described in 1936 by Chatton and Villeneuve.

The type species is Eleutheroschizon duboscqi Brasil 1906.
