= Caryotropha =

Scientific classification
- Domain: Eukaryota
- Clade: Sar
- Clade: Alveolata
- Phylum: Apicomplexa
- Class: Conoidasida
- Order: Eucoccidiorida
- Family: Caryotrophidae
- Genus: Caryotropha; Siedelecki, 1902
- Species: C. mesnili

Binomial name
- Caryotropha mesnili Siedelecki, 1902

Genus of single-celled organisms

Caryotropha is a monotypic genus of parasitic alveolates in the Apicomplexa phylum. This genus was described by Siedelecki in 1902.
