= Sporozoid =

Sporozoid may refer to a

- zoospore: The term sporozoid was formerly used in botany in this context.
- sporozoan (sporozoid protozoan), a member of the Sporozoa (now Apicomplexa, protists).

See also

- sporozoite, a stage in the apicomplexan life cycle
