= Nimbus cartalinius =

Scientific classification
- Kingdom: Animalia
- Phylum: Arthropoda
- Clade: Pancrustacea
- Class: Insecta
- Order: Coleoptera
- Suborder: Polyphaga
- Infraorder: Scarabaeiformia
- Family: Scarabaeidae
- Genus: Nimbus
- Species: N. cartalinius

Binomial name
- Nimbus cartalinius (Olsoufieff, 1918)

Synonyms
- Aphodius (Nimbius) cartalinius Olsoufieff, 1918

Species of beetle

Nimbus cartalinius is a species of beetle of the family Scarabaeidae. It is found in Azerbaijan, Georgia and Turkey.

== Description ==
Adults reach a length of about 5–6.5 mm (0.20–0.26 in). They are very similar to Nimbus contaminatus, but the dorsal surface is more lustrous, the fringe of hairs along the sides of the pronotum is long, but sparser and the elytra are far less hairy.
