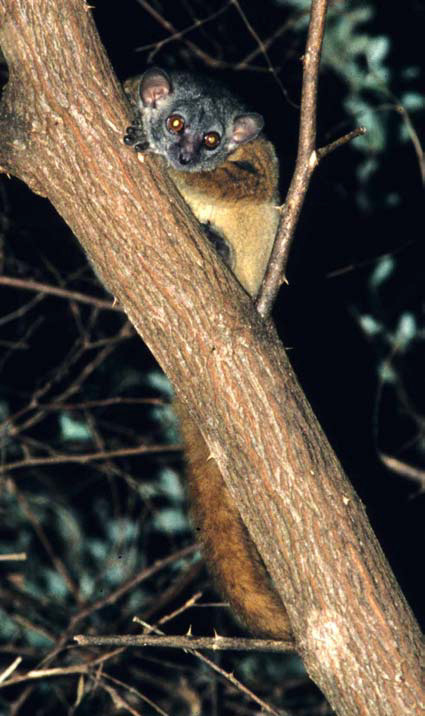

Conservation status
- Endangered (IUCN 3.1)
- CITES Appendix I

Scientific classification
- Kingdom: Animalia
- Phylum: Chordata
- Class: Mammalia
- Order: Primates
- Suborder: Strepsirrhini
- Family: Lepilemuridae
- Genus: Lepilemur
- Species: L. aeeclis

Binomial name
- Lepilemur aeeclis Andriaholinirina et al., 2017
- Distribution of L. aeeclis

= AEECL's sportive lemur =

Species of mammal

The Antafia sportive lemur, or red-shouldered sportive lemur (Lepilemur aeeclis) is a sportive lemur endemic to Madagascar. It has a total length of about 52 to 59 cm (20 to 23 in), of which 24–26 cm (9.4–10.2 in) are tail. The AEECL's sportive lemur is found in western Madagascar, living in dry deciduous forests.

The species was named in honor of the Association Européenne pour l'Étude et la Conservation des Lémuriens (the A.E.E.C.L.) for its twelve years of support to the research team that discovered it. It is unusual in having a specific name based on an acronym.

== See also ==
Other species with acronym-derived names:

- Apterichtus ansp
- GERP's mouse lemur
- Klossiella quimrensis
- Turbonilla musorstom
