= Nimbus harpagonis =

Scientific classification
- Kingdom: Animalia
- Phylum: Arthropoda
- Clade: Pancrustacea
- Class: Insecta
- Order: Coleoptera
- Suborder: Polyphaga
- Infraorder: Scarabaeiformia
- Family: Scarabaeidae
- Genus: Nimbus
- Species: N. harpagonis

Binomial name
- Nimbus harpagonis (Reitter, 1890)

Synonyms
- Aphodius harpagonis Reitter, 1890

Species of beetle

Nimbus harpagonis is a species of beetle of the family Scarabaeidae. It is found in Syria, Palestine and Lebanon.

== Description ==
Adults reach a length of about 4.2–5 mm (0.17–0.20 in). They have a convex, glossy, almost glabrous body. The margins of the head and the lateral edges of the pronotum are reddish-yellow and the elytra are yellowish-brown with a blackish pattern. The legs are yellowish-brown.
