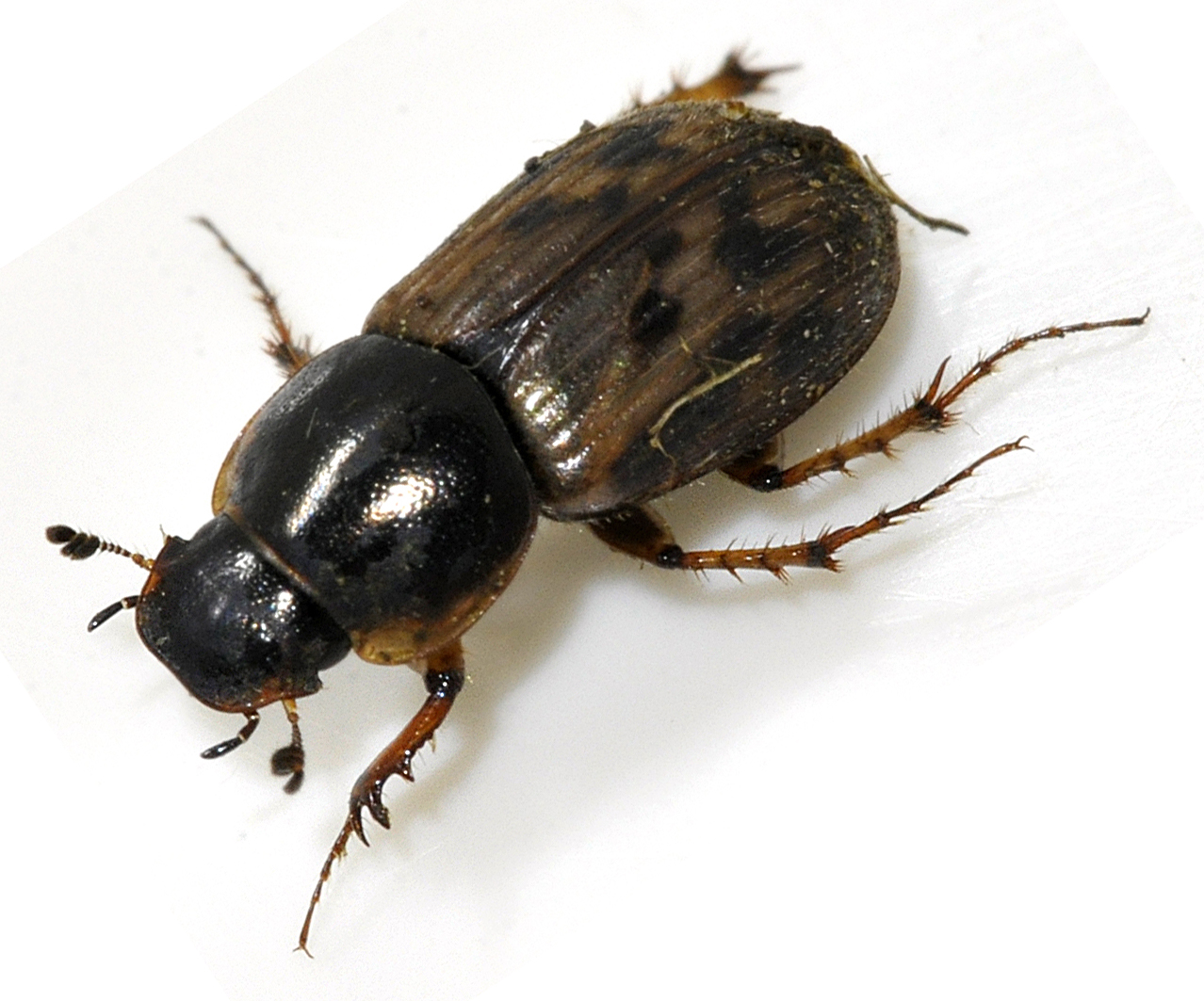
- Nimbus contaminatus, Germany

Scientific classification
- Kingdom: Animalia
- Phylum: Arthropoda
- Clade: Pancrustacea
- Class: Insecta
- Order: Coleoptera
- Suborder: Polyphaga
- Infraorder: Scarabaeiformia
- Family: Scarabaeidae
- Subfamily: Aphodiinae
- Genus: Nimbus; Mulsant & Rey, 1869

Synonyms
- Aphodius (Nimbus) Mulsant & Rey, 1870

= Nimbus (beetle) =

Genus of beetles

Nimbus is a genus of scarab, stag and bess beetles in the subfamily Aphodiinae. There are about 13 described species in Nimbus.

== Species ==
- Nimbus affinis (Panzer, 1823)
- Nimbus anyerae (Ruiz, 1998)
- Nimbus cartalinius (Olsoufieff, 1918)
- Nimbus contaminatus (Herbst, 1783)
- Nimbus franzinii (Pittino, 1978)
- Nimbus harpagonis (Reitter, 1890)
- Nimbus hoberlandti (Tesar, 1945)
- Nimbus johnsoni (Baraud, 1976)
- Nimbus libanonensis (Petrovitz, 1958)
- Nimbus marianii (Pittino, 1978)
- Nimbus obliteratus (Panzer, 1823)
- Nimbus proximus (Adam, 1994)
- Nimbus richardi (Veiga, 1984)
