= Grasseella =

Scientific classification
- Domain: Eukaryota
- Clade: Diaphoretickes
- Clade: Sar
- Clade: Alveolata
- Phylum: Apicomplexa
- Class: Marosporida
- Family: Aggregatidae
- Genus: Grasseella; Tuzet and Ormières, 1960
- Species: G. microcosmi

Binomial name
- Grasseella microcosmi Tuzet and Ormières, 1960

Genus of single-celled organisms

Grasseella is a genus in the phylum Apicomplexa.

== History ==
This genus was created by Tuzet and Ormières in 1960.

== Taxonomy ==
There is one species recognised in this genus.

== Description ==
This species infects an ascidian worm (Microcosmus sulcatus).

The oocysts have many sporocysts, each with 2 sporozoites.
