= Nimbus proximus =

Scientific classification
- Kingdom: Animalia
- Phylum: Arthropoda
- Clade: Pancrustacea
- Class: Insecta
- Order: Coleoptera
- Suborder: Polyphaga
- Infraorder: Scarabaeiformia
- Family: Scarabaeidae
- Genus: Nimbus
- Species: N. proximus

Binomial name
- Nimbus proximus Adam, 1994

Species of beetle

Nimbus proximus is a species of dung beetles in the subfamily Aphodiinae. It is found in the Palaearctic (France, Spain, and Portugal).
