= Apterichtus ansp =

Scientific classification
- Kingdom: Animalia
- Phylum: Chordata
- Class: Actinopterygii
- Division: Teleostei
- Order: Anguilliformes
- Family: Ophichthidae
- Genus: Apterichtus
- Species: A. ansp

Binomial name
- Apterichtus ansp (J. E. Böhlke, 1968)

Synonyms
- Verma ansp J. E. Böhlke, 1968

Species of fish

Apterichtus ansp, the Academy eel, is a species of snake eel native to the western Atlantic Ocean from North Carolina, United States through the Bahamas to Brazil. It is known to dwell down to a maximum depth of 200 metres (660 ft), and leads a benthic lifestyle, inhabiting burrows in the sand in surf areas. This species can reach a length of 54 centimetres (21 in) TL.

The specific name ansp is the acronym of the Academy of Natural Sciences of Philadelphia, where J. E. Böhlke, who named the species, was the curator.

== See also ==
Other species named after acronyms:

- AEECL's sportive lemur
- GERP's mouse lemur
- Klossiella quimrensis
- Turbonilla musorstom
