= Nimbus obliteratus =

Scientific classification
- Kingdom: Animalia
- Phylum: Arthropoda
- Clade: Pancrustacea
- Class: Insecta
- Order: Coleoptera
- Suborder: Polyphaga
- Infraorder: Scarabaeiformia
- Family: Scarabaeidae
- Genus: Nimbus
- Species: N. obliteratus

Binomial name
- Nimbus obliteratus (Panzer, 1823)

Synonyms
- Aphodius obliteratus Panzer, 1823; Aphodius (Nimbus) obliteratus fumatus Endrödi, 1955; Melinopterus obliteratus fulveolus Mulsant, 1842; Aphodius insubidus Germar, 1823

Species of beetle

Nimbus obliteratus, the lesser-streaked dung beetle, is a species of beetle of the family Scarabaeidae. It is found in Austria, Belgium, Bosnia and Herzegovina, Bulgaria, Croatia, the Czech Republic, Denmark, France, Georgia, Germany, Great Britain, Greece, Hungary, Ireland, Israel, Italy, Latvia, Macedonia, Malta, the Netherlands, Poland, Romania, Russia, Slovakia, Slovenia, Spain, Sweden, Switzerland, Turkey and Ukraine.

== Description ==
Adults reach a length of about 5–6 mm (0.20–0.24 in). They have an oblong, moderately convex, shiny, pubescent, blackish body. The margin of the clypeus is testaceous and the sides of the pronotum are yellowish. The elytra are brown-yellow with blackish suture and blackish discal spots.
