= Ithania wenrichi =

Scientific classification
- Domain: Eukaryota
- Clade: Sar
- Clade: Alveolata
- Phylum: Apicomplexa
- Class: Conoidasida
- Order: Eucoccidiorida
- Family: Adeleidae
- Subfamily: Ithaniinae
- Genus: Ithania; Ludwig, 1947
- Species: I. wenrichi

Binomial name
- Ithania wenrichi Ludwig, 1947

Species of single-celled organism

Ithania is a genus of parasitic alveolates of the phylum Apicomplexa.

This genus was described in 1947 by Ludwig.

== Description ==
This genus has only a single recognised species - Ithania wenrichi. This species infects the larvae of the crane fly (Tipula abdominali).
