= Turbonilla musorstom =

Scientific classification
- Kingdom: Animalia
- Phylum: Mollusca
- Class: Gastropoda
- Family: Pyramidellidae
- Genus: Turbonilla
- Species: T. musorstom

Binomial name
- Turbonilla musorstom Peñas & Rolán, 2010

Synonyms
- Turbonilla (Pyrgiscilla) musorstom Peñas & Rolán, 2010

Species of gastropod

Turbonilla musorstom is a species of sea snail, a marine gastropod mollusk in the family Pyramidellidae, the pyrams and their allies.

The specific name musorstom is the acronym for the joint expeditions by the Muséum national d'Histoire naturelle (‘Mus.’) and the Office de la Recherche Scientifique et Technique Outre-Mer (‘Orstom’).

== Description ==
The shell grows to a length of 3.6 mm.

== Distribution ==
This species occurs in the Pacific Ocean off the Solomons and Fiji.

== See also ==
Other species with acronym names:

- AEECL's sportive lemur
- Apterichtus ansp
- GERP's mouse lemur
- Klossiella quimrensis
