= Gustav Schneider =

- Born: 28 July 1834; Michelbach (Nassau), Germany
- Died: 14 May 1900 (aged 65)
- Scientific career
- Fields: Botanist
- Author abbrev. (botany): Gus.Schneid.

Gustav Schneider (28 July 1834 – 14 May 1900) was a German botanist, taxidermist and dealer working in Switzerland.

He was born in Michelbach (Nassau), Germany, in 1834. He moved to Basel, Switzerland in 1858 to start working as conservator and taxidermist at the Natural History Museum. He worked there until 1876 having founded his "Zoologisches Comptoir" business with which he was dealing in natural history specimens. He also continued working as a taxidermist.

He described for the first time Hieracium macrostolonum. The Poaceae Danthonia schneiderii is named in honor of Camillo Karl Schneider, who collected the type specimen in Yunnan.

== Honours ==
=== Eponyms ===
- (Poaceae) Danthonia schneiderii var. minor (Hooker) U. Shukla

== Selected publications ==
- Ernst Adolf Sagorski, Gustav Schneider. 1891. Flora der Centralkarpathen mit specieller Berücksichtigung der in der Hohen Tatra vorkommenden Phanerogamen und Gefäss-Cryptogamen nach eigenen und fremden Beobachtungen. Ed. E. Kummer. 2 pp.

=== Books ===
- Gustav Schneider, E. Macker. 1916. Gustav Schneider: 1834–1900. 69 pp.
