= Haemogregarina =

Scientific classification
- Domain: Eukaryota
- Clade: Sar
- Clade: Alveolata
- Phylum: Apicomplexa
- Class: Conoidasida
- Order: Eucoccidiorida
- Suborder: Adeleorina
- Family: Haemogregarinidae
- Genus: Haemogregarina; Danilewsky, 1885

Genus of single-celled organisms

Haemogregarina is a genus of haemoprotozoans, parasitic mainly on cold-blooded vertebrates. They are unicellular organisms which are parasitic in the red blood cells. Haemogregarina infects lower vertebrates (fish and reptiles) as intermediate hosts and leeches as definitive hosts.

== History ==
It was described in 1885 by Danilewsky from the European pond turtle (Emys orbicularis).

== General description ==
These parasites are generally considered non-pathogenic, and have been described in the red blood cells of desert tortoises. They are elongate to fusiform oval organisms found in the red blood cells. Although the size varies, they are larger than the cell's nucleus. The organism stains a basophilic colour and has a surrounding clear zone.

== Species ==
The following species are recognised:

- Haemogregarina acanthoclini Laird, 1953
- Haemogregarina anarhichadis Henry, 1912
- Haemogregarina balistapi
- Haemogregarina bettencourti França, 1908
- Haemogregarina bigemina Laveran & Mesnil, 1901
- Haemogregarina blanchardi Brumpt & Lebailly, 1904
- Haemogregarina bothi Lebailly, 1905
- Haemogregarina carchariasi Laveran, 1908
- Haemogregarina clavata Neumann, 1909
- Haemogregarina coelorhynchi Laird, 1952
- Haemogregarina cotti Brumpt & Lebailly, 1904
- Haemogregarina curvata Hayes, Smit, Seddon, Wertheim & Davies, 2006
- Haemogregarina dakarensis Léger & Leger, 1920
- Haemogregarina dasyatis Saunders, 1958
- Haemogregarina delagei Laveran & Mesnil, 1901
- Haemogregarina gobii Brumpt & Lebailly, 1904
- Haemogregarina gobionis Franchini & Saini, 1923
- Haemogregarina hartochi Kohl-Yakimoff & Yakimoff, 1915
- Haemogregarina hemiscyllii Mackerras & Mackerras, 1961
- Haemogregarina heterodontii von Prowazek, 1910
- Haemogregarina hoplichthys Laird, 1952
- Haemogregarina johnstoni Davis & Merrett, 2000
- Haemogregarina koppiensis Smit & Davies, 2001
- Haemogregarina laternae Lebailly, 1904
- Haemogregarina leptocotti Hill & Hendrickson, 1991
- Haemogregarina leptoscopi Laird, 1952
- Haemogregarina lobiani Yakimov & Kohl-Yakimov, 1912 emend Levine, 1985
- Haemogregarina londoni Yakimov & Kohl-Yakimov, 1912
- Haemogregarina marzinowskii Yakimov & Kohl-Yakimov, 1912
- Haemogregarina mavori Laird & Bullock, 1969
- Haemogregarina minuta Neumann, 1909
- Haemogregarina myoxocephali Fantham, Porter & Richardson, 1942
- Haemogregarina parmae Mackerras & Mackerras, 1925
- Haemogregarina platessae Lebailly, 1904
- Haemogregarina polypartita Neumann, 1909
- Haemogregarina quadrigemina Brumpt & Lebailly, 1904
- Haemogregarina roelofsi Hill & Hendrickson, 1991
- Haemogregarina rubrimarensis Saunders, 1960
- Haemogregarina sachai Kirmse, 1978
- Haemogregarina salariasi Laird, 1951
- Haemogregarina scorpaenae Neumann, 1909
- Haemogregarina simondi Laveran & Mesnil, 1901
- Haemogregarina tetraodontis Mackerras & Mackerras, 1961
- Haemogregarina torpedinis Neumann, 1909
- Haemogregarina wladimirovi Yakimov & Kohl-Yakimov, 1912
- Haemogregarina yakimovikohli Wladimiroff, 1910 emend Levine, 1985
