= Louis Brasil =

Professor at the faculty of science in Caen

Louis Lucien Brasil (2 September 1865 – 15 October 1918) was a professor at the faculty of science in Caen. He described several new taxa.

Brasil was born in the 13th arrondissement in Paris to naturalist and brewer Arthur Victor and Marie Amélie Claire Grimmett. He studied at the Faculty of Sciences in Caen and graduated in 1894. He became a zoology assistant in Caen in 1897 and received a doctorate from the faculty of sciences in Paris in 1904. He then became a lecturer in 1906 and assistant professor in 1910. From 1917 he was chair of zoology and animal physiology and director of the marine laboratory. He married Marie Blanche Leforestier in 1902 and they had three daughters. He presided over the Linnean Society of Normandy.

He described the bird subspecies Haliastur sphenurus johannae (after his first daughter) and Todiramphus sanctus canacorum in 1916 which are both considered junior synonyms. He also wrote six accounts in Genera Avium edited by Philogene Auguste Galilee Wytsman.
