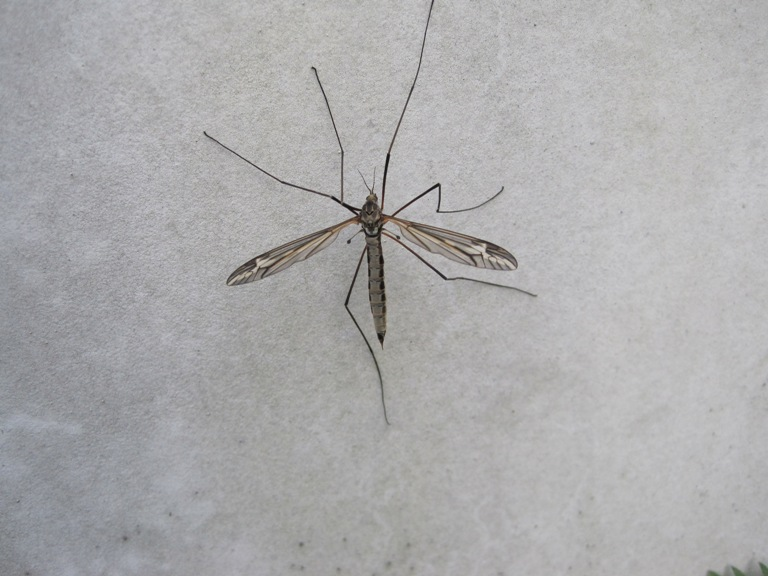
- Tipula vittata from the Netherlands

Scientific classification
- Kingdom: Animalia
- Phylum: Arthropoda
- Clade: Pancrustacea
- Class: Insecta
- Order: Diptera
- Family: Tipulidae
- Genus: Tipula
- Subgenus: Acutipula
- Species: T. vittata

Binomial name
- Tipula vittata Meigen, 1804

= Tipula vittata =

Species of fly

Tipula vittata is a species of fly in the family Tipulidae. It is found in the Palearctic.
