= Nimbus affinis =

Scientific classification
- Kingdom: Animalia
- Phylum: Arthropoda
- Clade: Pancrustacea
- Class: Insecta
- Order: Coleoptera
- Suborder: Polyphaga
- Infraorder: Scarabaeiformia
- Family: Scarabaeidae
- Genus: Nimbus
- Species: N. affinis

Binomial name
- Nimbus affinis (Panzer, 1823)

Synonyms
- Aphodius affinis Panzer, 1823; Aphodius ciliaris Schmidt, 1840; Aphodius ciliatus Dejean, 1833; Aphodius (Nimbus) affinis dorbignyi Clouët, 1896

Species of beetle

Nimbus affinis is a species of beetle of the family Scarabaeidae. It is found in Austria, Belgium, Bulgaria, Croatia, Czech Republic, France, Germany, Greece, Hungary, Macedonia, Poland, Portugal, Russia, Slovakia, Spain, Sweden, Switzerland, Ukraine, Algeria, Morocco and Tunisia.

== Description ==
Adults reach a length of about 5–6 mm (0.20–0.24 in). They have a moderately convex, moderately shiny body. The margins of the head and the sides of the pronotum are reddish-brown to reddish-yellow and the elytra are yellowish-brown, with dark brown spots. The dorsal surface is covered with hairs.

== Subspecies ==
- Nimbus affinis affinis (Austria, Belgium, Bulgaria, Croatia, Czech Republic, France, Germany, Greece, Hungary, Macedonia, Poland, Portugal, Russia, Slovakia, Spain, Sweden, Switzerland, Ukraine)
- Nimbus affinis dorbignyi (Clouët, 1896) (Algeria, Morocco, Tunisia)
