= Vasily Danilewsky =

Ukrainian scientist (1852–1939)

Vasily Iakovlevich Danilewsky
- Даниле́вский Васи́лий Я́ковлевич
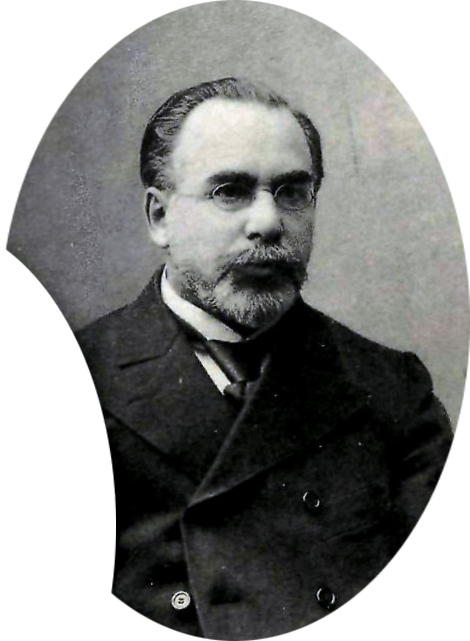
- Born: 13 January 1852; Kharkiv, Russian Empire
- Died: 25 February 1939 (aged 87); Kharkiv
- Citizenship: Russian Empire
- Education: University of Kharkiv
- Known for: Nervous system and bird parasites
- Scientific career
- Fields: Physiology and parasitology
- Workplaces: University of Kharkiv; Kharkiv Medical Institute; Danilevsky Institute of Endocrine Pathology Problems
- Thesis: Investigations into the physiology of the brain (1877)
- Author abbrev. (zoology): Danilewsky

Vasily Iakovlevich Danilewsky (variously spelled Vasili Yakovlevich Danilewsky or Vasili Yakolevich Danilevski or Vasily Yakovlevich Danilevsky, Ukrainian: Василь Якович Данилевський) (January 25 [O.S. January 13] 1852 – 25 February 1939) was a Ukrainian physician, physiologist and parasitologist. He was professor of physiology at University of Kharkiv and then at Kharkiv Medical Institute. He helped to establish the Danilevsky Institute of Endocrine Pathology Problems, which he directed until his death.

Danilewsky made important works in physiology, particularly in neurobiology. He was the first to give comprehensive description of nerve impulse in the brain of dogs. He also worked on the physiological responses of hypnosis in animals and humans. He was one of the pioneers in study of insulin action. However his most well-known contribution is in parasitology. He was the first to investigate systematically on blood parasites of vertebrates such as birds, reptiles, and amphibians. He is the binomial authority of a number of bird parasites. His paper titled "About Blood Parasites (Haematozoa)" published in 1884 in the Russian Medicine journal is regarded as the foundation of modern parasitology in bird malaria and other protozoan infections.

A species of blood parasite in bird Haemoproteus danilewskyi is named after him.

== Biography ==
Danilewsky was born in Kharkiv (in the Russian Empire, now Ukraine), and was educated there. He graduated from the University of Kharkiv in 1874, and earned his doctoral degree in 1877, at the age of 25, upon the thesis Investigations into the physiology of the brain. He was professor of physiology at the University of Kharkiv during 1883 to 1909 and 1917 to 1921. From 1921 he transferred to Kharkiv Medical Institute. In 1927 the Russian Academy of Sciences established Danilevsky Institute of Endocrine Pathology Problems, which he directed until his death.

== Contributions ==
Danilewsky was one of the pioneers of neurobiology. He was the first to describe the nerve impulse system in the brain of dogs. However, his most notable works were in parasitology. In 1884, he was the first to observe the species of Haemoproteus, parasitic protozoan in the blood of birds, and established the order Haemospororida for it. He helped to establish a new genus Leucocytozoon (but did not give the name). He was the first to observe the genus in 1889. The first species described in 1898 was even named primarily after him as Leukocytozoen Danilewskyi.

Danilewsky was the first to describe the bird malaria. He discovered the symptoms of malaria in birds such as acute anaemia, enlargement of liver and spleen, accumulation of pigments in the blood cells. He also gave the first clue to the similarity of malaria of birds to that of humans. (This idea was followed by Ronald Ross in 1898 who won the Nobel Prize for Physiology or Medicine in 1902 for experimentally demonstrating the principle.) He identified the bird malaria parasites as "pseudovacules", and by 1885 he recognised for the first the existence of three separate genera of protozoan parasites in birds, now known as Plasmodium, Haemoproteus and Leucocytozoon. However, his publication was in Russian and therefore was not accessible to outside Russia, until they were translated into French in a three-volume book La Parasitologie Comparée du Sang in 1889.

Danilewsky described and discovered the protozoan Trypanosoma avium in 1885, the first known flagellate protozoan parasite in birds.
