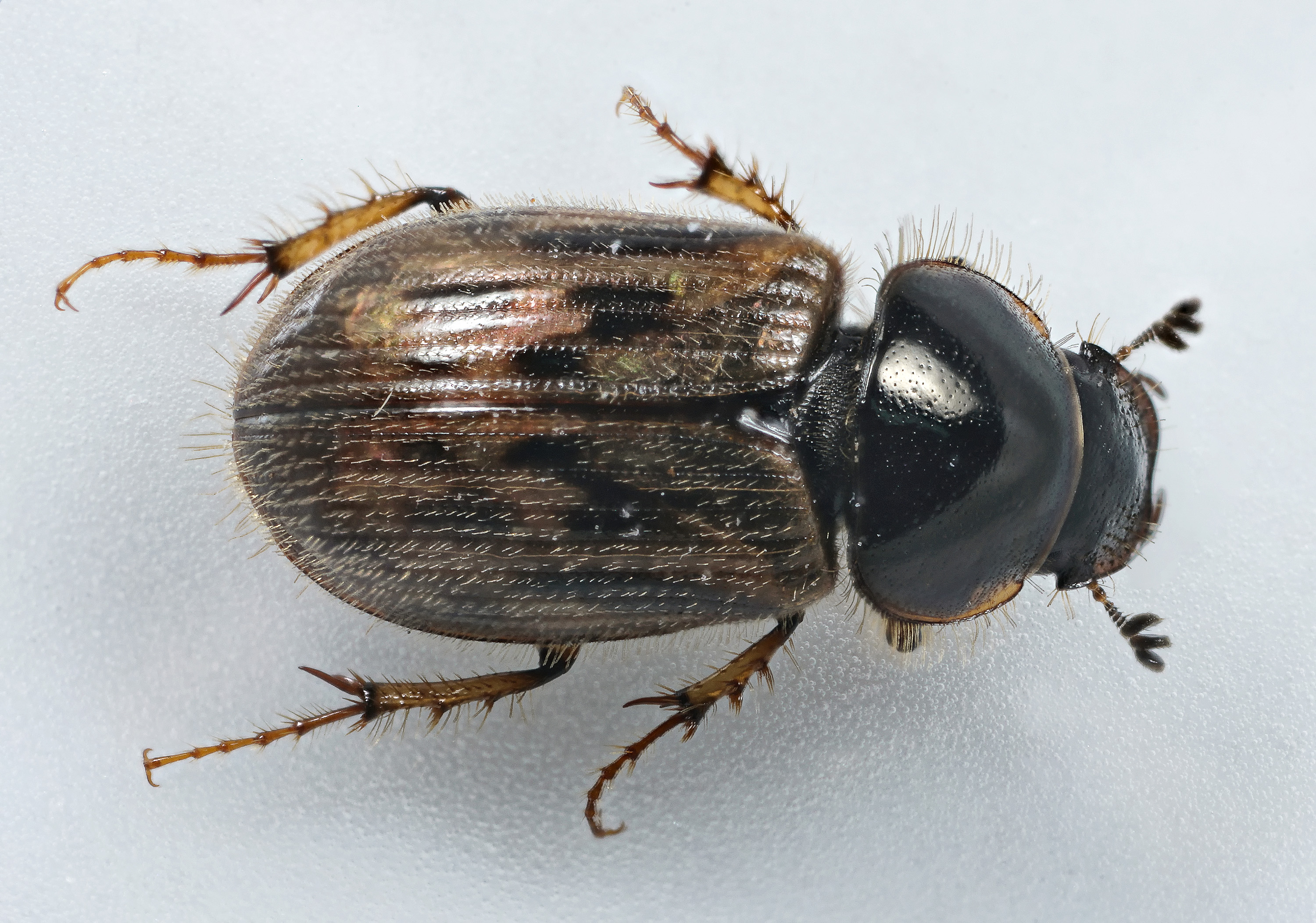

Scientific classification
- Kingdom: Animalia
- Phylum: Arthropoda
- Clade: Pancrustacea
- Class: Insecta
- Order: Coleoptera
- Suborder: Polyphaga
- Infraorder: Scarabaeiformia
- Family: Scarabaeidae
- Genus: Nimbus
- Species: N. contaminatus

Binomial name
- Nimbus contaminatus (Herbst, 1783)

Synonyms
- Scarabaeus contaminatus Herbst, 1783; Aphodius contaminatus; Aphodius casarum Gistel, 1857; Melinopterus contaminatus incoloratus Mulsant, 1842; Melinopterus contaminatus indistinctus Mulsant, 1842; Melinopterus contaminatus miser Mulsant, 1842; Scarabaeus ciliaris Marsham, 1802

= Nimbus contaminatus =

Species of beetle

Nimbus contaminatus, the black-streaked dung beetle, is a species of dung beetle native to Europe, where it has been recorded from Austria, Belgium, Bosnia and Herzegovina, Bulgaria, Croatia, the Czech Republic, Denmark, Finland, France, Georgia, Germany, Great Britain, Greece, Hungary, Ireland, Israel, Italy, Latvia, Lithuania, Luxembourg, the Netherlands, Norway, Poland, Portugal, Romania, Serbia, Slovakia, Slovenia, Sweden, Switzerland, Turkey and Ukraine.

== Taxonomy ==
This species was formerly a member of the genus Aphodius.
