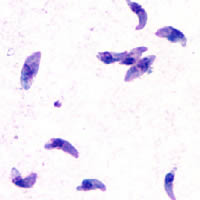
- Toxoplasma gondii tachyzoites

Scientific classification
- Domain: Eukaryota
- Clade: Sar
- Clade: Alveolata
- Phylum: Apicomplexa
- Class: Conoidasida
- Subclass: Coccidia
- Order: Eucoccidiorida; Léger & Duboscq, 1910

Suborders
- Adeleorina; Eimeriorina

= Eucoccidiorida =

Order of microscopic, spore-forming, single-celled parasites in the apicomplex phylum

The Eucoccidiorida are an order of microscopic, spore-forming, single-celled parasites belonging to the apicomplexan class Conoidasida. Protozoans of this order include parasites of humans, and both domesticated and wild animals including birds. Among these parasites are the Toxoplasma gondii that cause toxoplasmosis and Isospora belli, which results in isosporiasis.

== Definition ==
This is the largest order in the class Conoidasida and contains those species that all undergo merogony (asexual), gametogony (sexual) and sporogony (spore formation) during their lifecycles.

== Genera ==
18 families, three subfamilies, and 67 genera are recognised in this order. The genera include:

Adelea, Adelina, Alveocystis, Atoxoplasma, Babesiosoma, Barrouxia, Bartazoon, Besnoitia, Calyptospora, Caryospora, Caryotropha, Chagasella, Choleoeimeria, Cryptosporidium, Crystallospora, Cyclospora, Cyrilia, Cystoisospora, Dactylosoma, Desseria, Diaspora, Dorisa, Dorisiella, Eimeria, Elleipsisoma, Epieimeria, Frenkelia, Ganapatiella, Gibbsia, Goussia, Gousseffia, Grasseella, Hammondia, Haemogregarina, Hemolivia, Hepatozoon, Heydornia, Hoarella, Hyaloklossia, Isospora, Ithania, Karyolysus, Klossia, Klossiella, Lankesterella, Legerella, Mantonella, Nephroisospora, Neospora, Octosporella, Orcheobius, Ovivora, Pfeifferinella, Polysporella, Pseudoklossia, Pythonella, Rasajeyna, Sarcocystis, Schellackia, Selenococcidium, Selysina, Sivatoshella, Skrjabinella, Spirocystis, Toxoplasma, Tyzzeria, Wenyonella

Among the heteroxenous and cyst-forming genera are: Besnoitia, Cystoisospora, Frenkelia, Hammondia, Neospora, Sarcocystis, and Toxoplasma.

== Taxonomy ==
The taxonomy of this group is complex and only partly understood. Two major clades have been identified: the isosporoid coccidia (Toxoplasma, Neospora, Isospora [in part], and Sarcocystis) and a second clade containing Lankesterella, Caryospora and the eimeriid coccidia (Cyclospora, Isospora [in part] and Eimeria). Isospora is more closely related to the Toxoplasma/Neospora clade than to Sarcocystis.

== Families ==
About 1,000 species are in the genus Eimeria.

Some of the genera have been organised into families.

- Family Barrouxiidae
  - Barrouxia
  - Goussia
- Family Sarcocystidae
  - Besnoitia
  - Cystoisospora
  - Neospora
  - Sarcocystis
  - Toxoplasma
