= Apicomplexan life cycle =

Apicomplexa life cycle

Cellular structure of a typical, generalised apicomplexan: 1-polar ring, 2-conoid, 3-micronemes, 4-rhoptries, 5-nucleus, 6-nucleolus, 7-mitochondria, 8-posterior ring, 9-alveoli, 10-golgi apparatus, 11-micropore.

Apicomplexans, a group of intracellular parasites, have life cycle stages that allow them to survive the wide variety of environments they are exposed to during their complex life cycle. Each stage in the life cycle of an apicomplexan organism is typified by a cellular variety with a distinct morphology and biochemistry.

Not all apicomplexa develop all the following cellular varieties and division methods. This presentation is intended as an outline of a hypothetical generalised apicomplexan organism.

== Methods of asexual replication ==
Apicomplexans (sporozoans) replicate via ways of multiple fission (also known as schizogony). These ways include gametogony, sporogony and merogony, although the latter is sometimes referred to as schizogony, despite its general meaning.

Merogony is an asexually reproductive process of apicomplexa. After infecting a host cell, a trophozoite (see glossary below) increases in size while repeatedly replicating its nucleus and other organelles. During this process, the organism is known as a meront or schizont. Cytokinesis next subdivides the multinucleated schizont into numerous identical daughter cells called merozoites (see glossary below), which are released into the blood when the host cell ruptures. Organisms whose life cycles rely on this process include Theileria, Babesia, Plasmodium, and Toxoplasma gondii.

Sporogony is a type of sexual and asexual reproduction. It involves karyogamy, the formation of a zygote, which is followed by meiosis and multiple fission. This results in the production of sporozoites.

Other forms of replication include endodyogeny and endopolygeny. Endodyogeny is a process of asexual reproduction, favoured by parasites such as Toxoplasma gondii. It involves an unusual process in which two daughter cells are produced inside a mother cell, which is then consumed by the offspring prior to their separation.

Endopolygeny is the division into several organisms at once by internal budding.

== Glossary of cell types ==
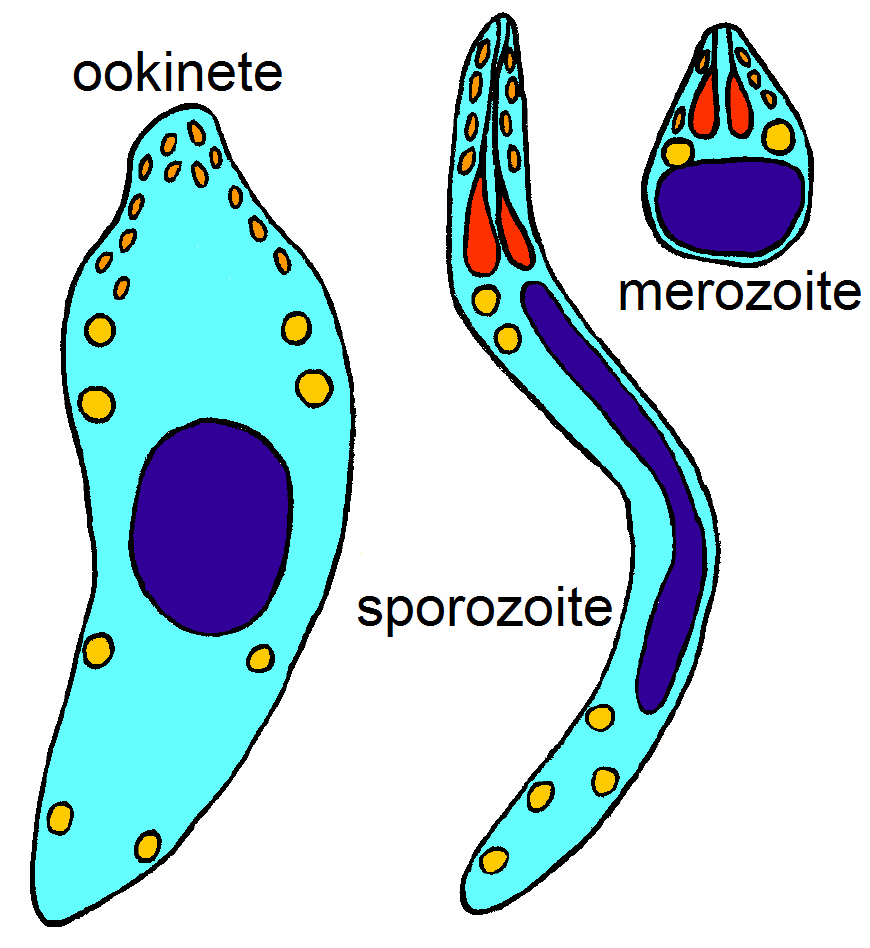
An ookinete (motile), a sporozoite (motile) and a merozoite (motile) of Plasmodium falciparum

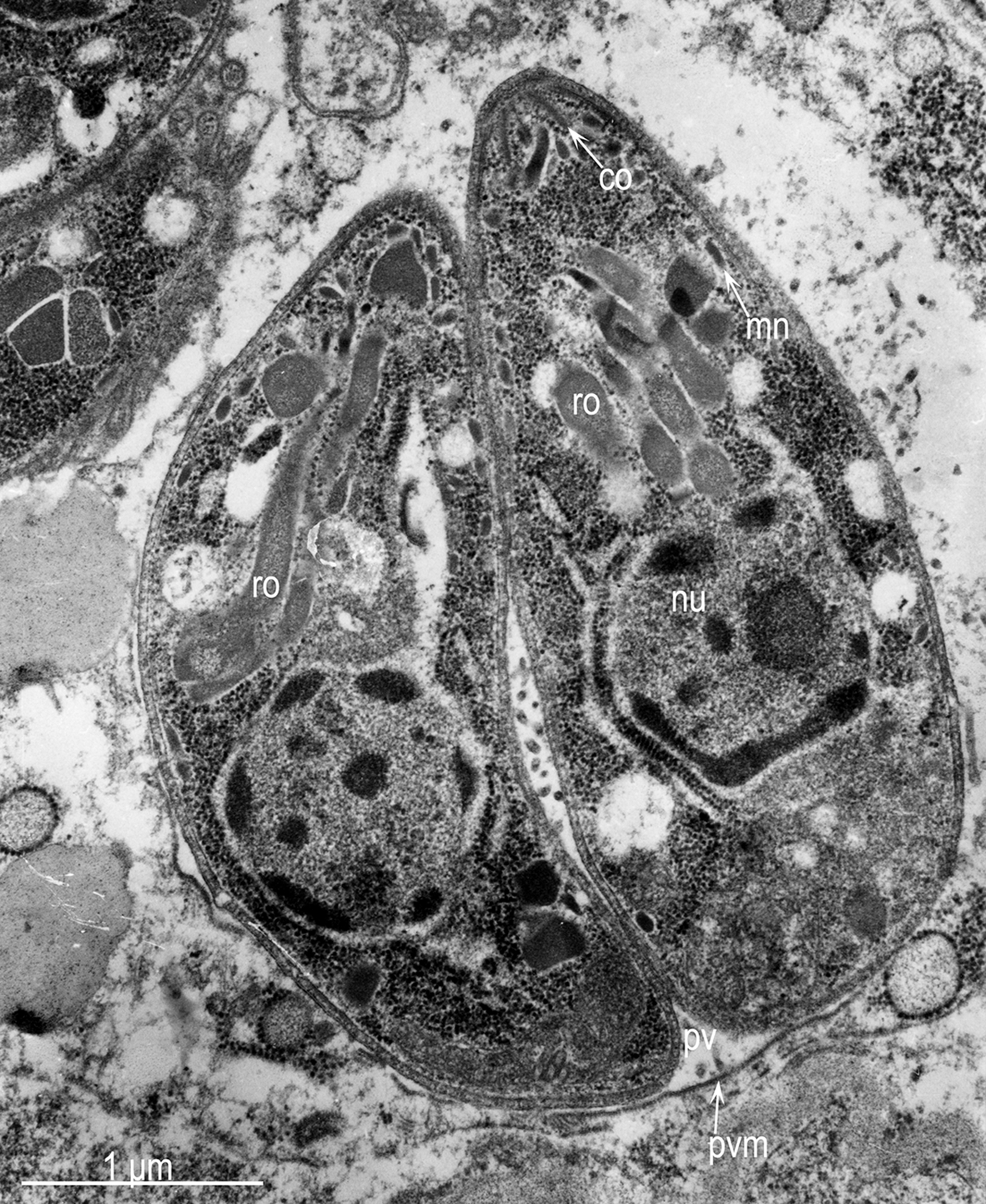
Two tachyzoites of Toxoplasma gondii, transmission electron microscopy

=== Infectious stages ===
A sporozoite (ancient Greek sporos, seed + zōon, animal) is the cell form that infects new hosts. In Plasmodium, for instance, the sporozoites are cells that develop in the mosquito's salivary glands, leave the mosquito during a blood meal, and enter liver cells (hepatocytes), where they multiply. Cells infected with sporozoites eventually burst, releasing merozoites into the bloodstream. Sporozoites are motile and they move by gliding.

A merozoite (G. meros, part [of a series] +zōon, animal) is the result of merogony that takes place within a host cell. During this stage, the parasite infects the host's cells and then replicates its own nucleus and induces cell segmentation in a form of asexual reproduction. In coccidiosis, merozoites form the first phase of the internal life cycle of coccidian. In the case of Plasmodium, merozoites infect red blood cells and then rapidly reproduce asexually. The red blood cell host is destroyed by this process, which releases many new merozoites that go on to find new blood-borne hosts. Merozoites are motile. Before schizogony, the merozoite is also known as the schizozoite.

A gametocyte (G. gametēs, partner + kytos, cell) is a name given to a parasite's gamete-forming cells. A male gametocyte divides to give many flagellated microgametes, whereas the female gametocyte differentiates to a macrogamete.

An ookinete (G. ōon, egg + kinētos, motile) is a fertilised zygote capable of moving spontaneously. It penetrates epithelial cells lining the midgut of mosquitoes to form a thick-walled structure known as an oocyst under the mosquito's outer gut lining. Ookinetes are motile and they move by gliding.

A trophozoite (G. trophē, nourishment + zōon, animal) is the activated, intracellular feeding stage in the apicomplexan life cycle. After gorging itself on its host, the trophozoite undergoes schizogony and develops into a schizont, later releasing merozoites.

A hypnozoite (G. hypnos, sleep + zōon, animal) is a quiescent parasite stage that is best known for its "... probable association with latency and relapse in human malarial infections caused by Plasmodium ovale and P. vivax". Hypnozoites are directly sporozoite-derived.

A bradyzoite (G. bradys, slow + zōon, animal) is a sessile, slow-growing form of zoonotic microorganisms such as Toxoplasma gondii, among others responsible for parasitic infections. In chronic (latent) toxoplasmosis, bradyzoites microscopically present as clusters enclosed by an irregular crescent-shaped wall (cysts) in infected muscle and brain tissues. Also known as a bradyzoic merozoite.

A tachyzoite (G. tachys, fast + zōon, animal), contrasting with a bradyzoite, is a form typified by rapid growth and replication. Tachyzoites are the motile forms of those coccidians which form tissue pseudocysts, such as Toxoplasma and Sarcocystis. Typically infecting cellular vacuoles, tachyzoites divide by endodyogeny and endopolygeny. Also known as a tachyzoic merozoite (same journal reference as for "bradyzoic merozoite", above).

An oocyst (G. ōon, egg + kystis, bladder) is a hardy, thick-walled spore, able to survive for lengthy periods outside a host. The zygote develops within the spore, which acts to protect it during transfer to new hosts. Organisms that create oocysts include Eimeria, Isospora, Cryptosporidium, and Toxoplasma.

Life cycle of the Babesia parasite

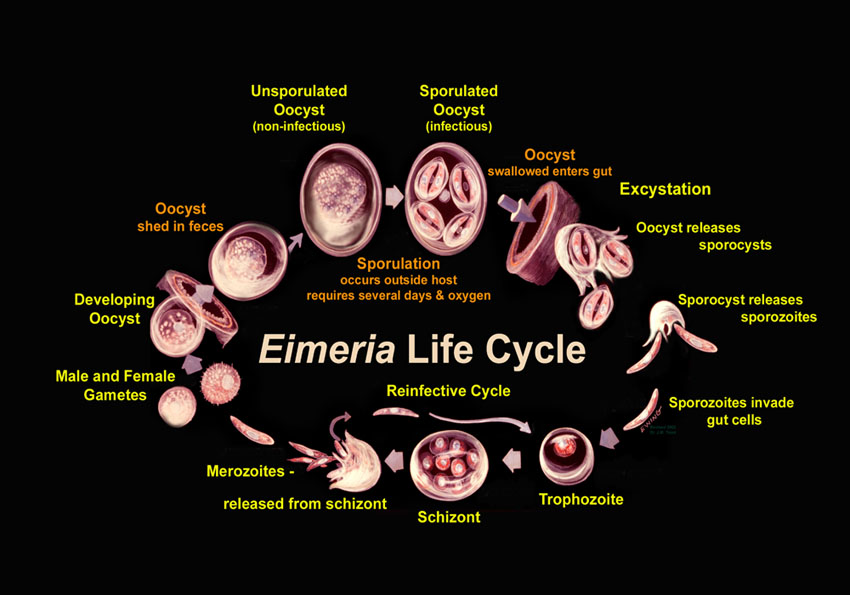
Life cycle of the Eimeria parasite

Life cycle of the Toxoplasma parasite

== Genome size ==
The dynamics of gene loss was studied in 41 apicomplexan genomes. Loss of genes employed in amino acid metabolism and steroid biosynthesis could be explained by metabolic redundancy with the host. Also, DNA repair genes tend to be lost by apicomplexans with reduced proteome size, probably reflecting a reduced need for DNA repair of genomes with smaller information content. Reduced DNA repair may help explain the elevated mutation rates in pathogens with reduced genome size.

== See also ==
- Trematode life cycle stages
