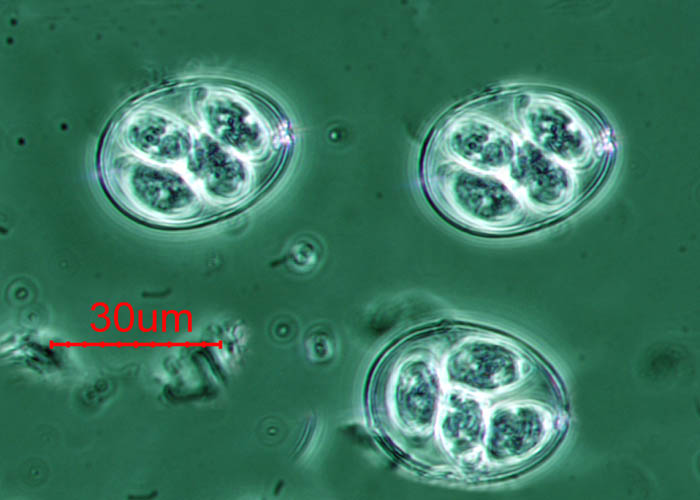
- Eimeria maxima oocysts

Scientific classification
- Domain: Eukaryota
- Clade: Sar
- Clade: Alveolata
- Phylum: Apicomplexa
- Class: Conoidasida; Levine, 1988

Subclasses
- Coccidia; Gregarinasina

= Conoidasida =

Class of single-celled organisms

Conoidasida is a class of parasitic alveolates in the phylum Apicomplexa. The class was defined in 1988 by Levine and contains two subclasses – the coccidia and the gregarines. All members of this class have a complete, hollow, truncated conoid. Gregarines tend to parasitize invertebrates with the mature gamonts being extracellular; the coccidia mostly infect vertebrates and have intracellular gamonts.

== Description ==
A conoid is found in most species and when present forms complete but truncated cone.

Sexual and asexual reproduction are present in life cycle of all species. Each zygote normally forms an oocyst wall within which it undergoes meiosis. This is sometimes followed by mitosis. This process of sporogony produces mobile vermiform infectious sporozoites.

Multiple mitotic divisions (schizogony) also occur during merogony of the feeding stages (trophozoites) and during gametogony.

=== Motility ===
Microgametes of some species are flagellated. Locomotion of other gametes and any other motile stages is by gliding or body flexion. Some species possess pseudopodia but use them only in phagocytosis.
