= Eimeria arloingi =

Scientific classification
- Domain: Eukaryota
- Clade: Diaphoretickes
- Clade: SAR
- Clade: Alveolata
- Phylum: Apicomplexa
- Class: Conoidasida
- Order: Eucoccidiorida
- Family: Eimeriidae
- Genus: Eimeria
- Species: E. arloingi

Binomial name
- Eimeria arloingi (Marotel, 1905) Martin, 1909

Species of parasitic alveolate

Eimeria arlongi is a species of Eimeria that causes clinical coccidiosis in goats. It and Eimeria ninakohlyakimovae are two of the most pathogenic species for goats. It is particularly prevalent in goat kids in Iran. Issues with coccidiosis specifically due to Eimeria arloingi have also been reported in Egypt and Portugal. It is unclear whether this species is present in the Americas as most of the case reports of coccidiosis in these areas do not differentiate the species causing the disease. Infections with this species are commonly compounded by infections with other Eimeria species in "mixed infections." This species is closely related to Eimeria bovis and Eimeria zuernii which are both highly pathogenic in cattle' Infections with this species are characterized by lesions specifically in the jejunum, but also the ilium and cecum which results in diarrhea. Oocysts begin shedding between 16 and 18 days after the animal is infected which is when the parasite is spread. The shedding can last as long as 15 days. This parasite causes an immune response in its host that includes accumulation of fluid in body cavities, presence of large numbers of leukocytes in the small intestine, and necrosis of the tissue of the small intestine. Pale yellow plaques (raised patches of epithelium) can be seen on the small intestine of severely affected kids at necropsy.

== Treatment ==
Possible treatments include decoquinate, lasalocid, sulfonamides, chlortetracycline, amprolium, monensin, toltrazuril, and diclazuril. Decoquinate, toltrazuril, and diclazuril act on Eimeria at all stages of life. Specific studies to determine the best treatment for Eimeria arloingi infections have not been performed. All treatments should be group treatment accompanied by movement of animals to a clean environment. All treatment plans should be approved by a veterinarian.
