= Bighead =

Bighead or Big Head may refer to:

== Fish ==
- Big-head schizothoracin, a species of fish in the family Cyprinidae found only in Xinjiang, China
- Bighead carp, a species of freshwater fish that is one of the most intensively exploited fishes in aquaculture
- Bighead catshark, a species of deep-sea fish in the family Scyliorhinidae found off the coast of Western Australia
- Bighead goby, either of two species of goby
- Bighead pupfish, a critically endangered species of pupfish in the family Cyprinodontidae
- Bighead sculpin, a species of sculpin fish that is endemic to the Lake Baikal watershed in Siberia, Russia
- Bighead spurdog, a rare and little-known species of dogfish shark in the family Squalidae.

== Media ==
=== Books ===
- The Bighead, a 1997 extreme horror novel written by Edward Lee (writer)
- Bighead (graphic novel), a graphic novel written and illustrated by Jeffrey Brown

=== Music ===
- "Big Head", a track from the 1997 Cartoon Planet soundtrack album Space Ghost's Musical Bar-B-Que
- "Big Head (song)", a 2002 single by American rapper Ms. Jade from the Girl Interrupted (album)

=== Television ===
- Bigheads, a 2017 British television game show
- The Bigheads, Bev, Ed and Rachel Bighead, a family of cane toads from animated television series Rocko's Modern Life, see List of Rocko's Modern Life characters

=== Video games ===
- Big head mode, a type of video game cheat code that enlarges the heads of characters

== People ==
- Bighead, a fictional criminal mastermind in American comedy sketch The Ambiguously Gay Duo
- Bighead (record producer), an American record producer, songwriter and DJ.
- Big Head, a fictional character in American comedy Silicon Valley (TV series)
- Jack Bighead, an American football player
- Wu Kwok Hung, a former Hong Kong professional football player nicknamed "Big Head"

== Plants ==
- Centaurea macrocephala, a species of flowering plant in the family Asteraceae with many common names including Bighead knapweed
- Juncus megacephalus, the bighead rush, a plant species native to the United States

== Other uses ==
- Bighead River, a river in Grey County in southern Ontario, Canada
- Hydrophis annandalei, common name bighead sea snake, a species of venomous snake in the subfamily Hydrophiinae

== See also ==
- Grosse Tête, Louisiana (French for "big head"), a village in Louisiana, United States
- Megalocephalus (Latin for "big head"), an extinct genus of baphetid amphibian from the late Carboniferous
- Macrocephaly, a medical condition where the head is abnormally large
