= E. maxima =

E. maxima may refer to:

- Ecklonia maxima, a brown algae
- Eimeria maxima, an apicomplexan parasite
- Elachista maxima, a European moth
- Entophlyctis maxima, a primitive fungus
- Euphaedra maxima, an African butterfly
