= Goussia =

Scientific classification
- Domain: Eukaryota
- Clade: Sar
- Clade: Alveolata
- Phylum: Apicomplexa
- Class: Conoidasida
- Order: Eucoccidiorida
- Family: Barrouxiidae
- Genus: Goussia; Labbe 1896

Species
- Goussia aculeati Goussia alburni Goussia anopli Goussia arinae Goussia auratus Goussia balatonica Goussia bettae Goussia biwaensis Goussia bohemica Goussia carpelli Goussia centropomi Goussia cernui Goussia chalupskyi Goussia cichlidarurn Goussia clupearum Goussia cultrati Goussia cruciata Goussia degiusti Goussia girellae Goussia grygieri Goussia gymnocephali Goussia flaviviridis Goussia freemani Goussia hyalina Goussia hyperolisi Goussia iroquoina Goussia janae Goussia koertingi Goussia lacazei Goussia legeri Goussia leucisci Goussia luciopercae Goussia lusca Goussia malayensis Goussia metchnikovi Goussia minuta Goussia molnarica Goussia neglecta Goussia nipponica Goussia noelleri Goussia notemigonica Goussia notropicum Goussia pannonica Goussia peleci Goussia polylepidis Goussia pogonognathi Goussia scardinii Goussia siliculiformis Goussia sinensis Goussia soumbediounensis Goussia sparis Goussia spraguei Goussia stankovitchi Goussia subepithelialis Goussia thelohani Goussia trichogasteri Goussia vanasi Goussia vimbae Goussia wakabayashii

Genus of parasitic protists in the apicomplex phylum

Goussia is a taxonomic genus, first described in 1896 by Labbé, containing parasitic protists which largely target fish and amphibians as their hosts. Members of this genus are homoxenous and often reside in the gastrointestinal tract of the host, however others may be found in organs such as the gallbladder or liver. The genera Goussia, as current phylogenies indicate, is part of the class Conoidasida, which is a subset of the parasitic phylum Apicomplexa; features of this phylum, such as a distinct apical complex containing specialized secretory organelles, an apical polar ring, and a conoid are all present within Goussia, and assist in the mechanical invasion of host tissue. The name Goussia is derived from the French word gousse, meaning pod. This name is based on the bi-valve sporocyst morphology which some Goussians display. Of the original 8 classified Goussians, 6 fit the “pod” morphology. As of this writing, the genera consists of 59 individual species.

== Description ==
Physiology

Goussians share a similar morphology, with certain characteristics remaining widely conserved throughout the genera. In general goussians have thin walled oocysts lacking a micropyle, which contain four bivalved sporocysts. The two valves composing the sporocyst are identical and have a single longitudinal joint running along the midline. In some specific species there is a dual membrane structure which is associated with the joint. These associated membranes are quite delicate and can be difficult to observe under an electron microscope as the fixation process often leads to damage or the full destruction of this membranous structure. As do many apicomplexans, Goussia feature a conical-shaped structure towards the apical end of their cells made of fibers, which are currently unknown, that surround the rhoptries. The conoid is thought to have a mechanical function and assist in the entrance into host cells in order to form a characteristic parasitophorous vacuole.

Rhopteries and micronemes are located below the conoid in the apical end of the cell. These two organelles have a unique secretory function and aid in the adhesion to enterocytes in the gastrointestinal tract. This ensures that Goussia is able to gain substantial access to host cells, before being passed through the host with the feces.

Members of the genera Goussia also retain an apical polar ring, which act as microtubule organizing centers in the cell and apicoplasts, which are specialized plastids involved in various synthesis activities carried out by the cell, (heam, lipids etc). It has been noted that the destruction of the apicoplast does not immediately kill the cell, but it prevents it from infecting other host cells. Apicoplasts are currently being investigated as a potential drug target to treat apicomplexans; due to the fact that it is derived from previously photosynthetic algae, herbicidal medications may be able to effectively treat these parasitic conditions without harming any of the host metabolic processes.

== History ==
In 1896 Labbé described two new protist genera - Goussia and Crystallospora - which only remained distinct genera up until 1909, at which time both Crystallospora and Goussia were reduced to synonyms of Eimeria. Around 1920 other protistologists used the term Goussia as a generic term to refer to new species. Subsequently, by 1953, Goussia began to somewhat re-emerge, and by some, was now classified as a subgenera of Eimeria but was later relegated to an Eimerial synonym once again. Currently, Goussia and Eimeria are widely considered to be separate genera, with the presence of a Stieda body being characteristic of Eimeria.

Stiedal bodies are microscopic organelles located at the polar regions of the cell and act as plugs, keeping the sporocyst’s occluding holes closed until the sporozoites are ready to be released. As it stands there are some piscine coccidia which lack Stiedal bodies and are part of other related genera. These will likely be remedied at some point and these organisms will see new classification under the genre Goussia.

== Lifecycle ==
As Goussians are members of the Coccidians, they exhibit merogany, gamogany and sporogoany, and in representative infections, which are both homoxenous and occur in the gastro intestinal tract of the host, all three lifecycle stages, with the exception of the motile zoites may be observed at all stages of the tract; no particular lifecycle stage is strongly associated with any gross anatomical feature of the host. The vast majority of parasitic cells are localized to the anterior of the intestines, as cell lingering towards the posterior are expulsed from the host with the feces, ready to begin looking for another host. Initially infection occurs with the motile zoite phase of the lifecycle. These cells direct their apical cell apparatus towards the host’s enterocytes and proceed to enter the cells so that their lifecycles may continue. Once physically inside the host’s enterocytes, Goussia localizes in the cell between the cytoplasm and the cell membrane, this particular localization is referred to as extracytoplasmic. Extracytoplasmic localization has two sub stages which occur, the first stage being referred to as “monopodial” and the second stage being referred to as “spider-like”. The monopodial stage occurs on the luminal side of the enterocyte and is characterized by a very close association between the hosts cell membrane and the host derived parasitophorous vacuole membrane, and a single large area of contact with the host cells cytoplasm; thus lending to the name “monopodial”. The spider-like stage is similar to the monopodial stage in that there is a close association of both the host cell membrane and the parasitophorous membrane, however, as opposed to a single large cytoplasmic contact site, there are many more contact sites which tend to be much more filose in morphology.

== Hosts ==
While largely confined to freshwater fish as hosts, some members of Goussia parasitize fish which swim in brackish waters, and others have abandoned fish all together in favour of amphibians and reptiles, such as reed frogs or common geckos. And while the vast majority of Goussia lifecycles are homoxenous, there have been a few examples of heteroxenous lifecycles which utilize tubifex worms as a sort of vector.

== Ecology ==
Found globally, Goussians are limited in that they need some sort of water source, both to mature in their sporogamy stage, and to be transmitted from host to host. The majority of its identified hosts are freshwater fish.

== Phylogeny ==
Proper taxonomic categorization of Goussia has been a challenge ever since the genera’s inception. This is due in part to the various similarities shared between Goussia and Eimeria including, similar hosts, lifecycle progression and general cell structure. Although the structure of the oocyst in Eimeria can be used as a distinct morphological feature to help identify members of the genus the same is not true for members of Goussia. Goussian oocysts are quite variable and are in no way an exact predictor of taxonomic classification, but at the very least if the species in question lacks the distinctive Eimerian oocyst, than it may reasonably suggest that the species could be a member of Goussia. As mentioned above stideal bodies also help in the classification of new species under the goussian genera, however these structures are quite small and rely on electron microscopy to be seen. In the classification of new species it would be most prudent to rely more on DNA technologies to differentiate between different species.

== Host records ==
- Goussia aculeati - three-spined stickleback (Gasterosteus aculeatus)
- Goussia alburni - gudgeon (Gobio gobio), roach (Rutilus rutilus), rudd (Scardinius erythrophthalmus)
- Goussia anopli - chubbyhead barb (Barbus anoplus)
- Goussia arinae - sabre carp (Pelecus cultratus)
- Goussia bettae - Siamese fighting fish (Betta splendens)
- Goussia carpelli - bitterling (Acheilognathus rhombeus), bleak (Alburnus alburnus), barbel (Barbus barbus), Baikal lake sculpin (Batrachocottus baicalensis), goldfish (Carassius auratus), Crucian carp (Carassius carassius), carp (Carassius cuvieri), Iberian mace (Chondrostoma polylepis), Kessler's sculpin (Cottus kessleri), common carp (Cyprinus carpio), Manchurian lake gudgeon (Gnathopogon strigatus), gudgeon (Gobio gobio), silver carp (Hypophthalmichthys molitrix), belica (Leucaspius delineatus), chub (Leuciscus cephalus), common dace (Leuciscus leuciscus), Limnocottus eurystomus, elritze (Phoxinus phoxinus), stone moroko (Pseudorasbora parva), roach (Rutilus rutilus) and tench (Tinca tinca). Also sludge worms (Limnodrilus hoffmeisteri and Tubifex tubifex)
- Goussia cernui - Eurasian Ruffe (Gymnocephalus cernuus)
- Goussia cichlidarurn - blue tilapia (Oreochromis aureus), Nile tilapia (Oreochromis niloticus) and Tilapia zillii
- Goussia clupearum - garfish (Belone belone)
- Goussia cruciata - horse mackerel (Trachurus trachurus)
- Goussia cultrati - sabre carp (Pelecus cultratus)
- Goussia degiusti - common shiner (Luxilus cornutus), bluntnose minnow (Pimephales notatus), fathead minnow (Pimephales promelas)
- Goussia flaviviridis - gecko (Hemidactylus flaviviridis)
- Goussia girellae - opaleye (Girella nigricans)
- Goussia gymnocephali - Eurasian Ruffe (Gymnocephalus cernuus)
- Goussia hyperolis - common reed frog (Hyperolius viridiflavus)
- Goussia iroquoina - common shiner (Luxilus cornutus), hornyhead chub (Nocomis biguttatus), blacknose shiner (Notropis herterolepis), rosyface shiner (Notropis rubellus), bluntnose minnow (Pimephales notatus), fathead minnow (Pimephales promelas), blacknose dace (Rhinichthys atratulus), Creed chub (Semotilus atromaulatus)
- Goussia lusca - pouting (Trisopterus luscus)
- Goussia lacazei (Labbé, 1895) n. comb. in the centipedes Lithobius forficatus and L. martini;
- Goussia luciopercae - zander (Stizostedion lucioperca)
- Goussia malayensis - Apocheilus panchax
- Goussia metchnikovi - white-finned gudgeon (Gobio albipinnatus), gudgeon (Gobio gobio), Kessler's gudgeon (Gobio kessleri), Amur whitefin gudgeon (Romanogobio tenuicorpus)
- Goussia molnarica - catfish (Clarias gariepinus)
- Goussia peleci - sabre carp (Pelecus cultratus)
- Goussia pogonognathi - Hemirhamphodon pogonognatus
- Goussia sinensis - silver carp (Hypophthalmichthys molitrix)
- Goussia sparis - gilt-head bream (Sparus aurata)
- Goussia vanasi - banded tilapia (Tilapia sparrmanii)
- Goussia vimbae - Vimba vimba vimba
