= Eimeria bovis =

Scientific classification
- Domain: Eukaryota
- Clade: Sar
- Clade: Alveolata
- Phylum: Apicomplexa
- Class: Conoidasida
- Order: Eucoccidiorida
- Family: Eimeriidae
- Genus: Eimeria
- Species: E. bovis

Binomial name
- Eimeria bovis (Züblin, 1908)

Species of single-celled organism

Eimeria bovis is a parasite belonging to the genus Eimeria and is found globally. The pathogen can cause a diarrheic disease in cattle (Bos taurus) referred to as either eimeriosis or coccidiosis. The infection predominantly cause disease in younger animals.

== Description ==
Eimeria bovis is a host specific parasite that is shed by infected cattle. The parasite enters the cattle via contaminated food, water or surfaces contaminated infective (sporulated) oocysts (fecal-oral-route). In the gut environment of the animal the oocysts hatch and releases 8 zoites. The zoites undergo two asexual cycles (schizogony). The first cycle produces many small schizonts inside the cells of the lamina propria, while the second generation of schizonts multiply in the cells of the epithelium. The second generation of schizonts undergo a sexual cycle (gametogony). The multiplication growth of new oocysts cause the destruction of mucosal cells which coincide with diarrhea in the animal. The time from ingestion of the parasite to the first signs of disease (prepatent period) is 16–21 days. The disease usually last 5–15 days (patent period). Oocysts can be observed in a microscope measuring 23–43 μm x 17–23 μm, ovoid shape, having a double-layered wall with a micropyle in the narrower end.

== Diagnosis ==
The infection status of an animal is evaluated by examining the oocysts using different flotation methods, usually by counting the oocysts under a light microscope and identifying the species of the Eimeria based on morphology. When evaluating if the animal is having eimeriosis, due to infection with E. bovis or other pathogenic Eimeria species such as Eimeria zuernii or Eimeria alabamensis, four things are taken into account: age of the animal, presence of a pathogenic Eimeria species, infection intensity (oocysts per gram faeces), and presence of symptoms (diarrhea, blood in the faeces, loss of appetite, fever, weight loss).

== Epidemiology ==
After new oocysts have been shed in the faeces of an infected animal factors in the environment affect how fast the oocysts sporulate and become infective. Outdoor environment, buildings and management (handling and density of animals, hygiene) can affect these conditions. When conditions favor sporulation of the oocysts they may become infective before the faeces are removed. Pathogenic Eimeria species, including E. bovis, can cause two types of epidemiological situations in a herd that also can manifest as a diasease outbreak: Winter coccidiosis or eimeriosis – animals becoming more susceptibile to infections due to cold and crowding of the animals facilitate the spread (housing of cattle at the end of a pasture season). Summer coccidiosis or eimeriosis – susceptible animals ingesting overwintering oocysts on pastures on turn-out and increased sporulation of new oocysts due to increasing temperatures. Eimeria bovis overwinter well in both soil and in faeces in temperate regions, and oocysts shed in the fall have a better chance of surviving until the next grazing season. Areas with shade on the pasture improve the survival chances of the oocyst. Predominantly calves are at risk. Outbreaks can result in high mortalities among young animals. Disease most commonly result in weight loss that can delay growth of the animal and affect the success as a production animal.

== Immunology ==
Following the initial infection with an Eimeria species the animal usually is protected by immunity to that species, and is less likely to develop disease. The level of immunity depend on the amount of oocysts that infected the animal.

== Response to environmental factors ==
The majority of the parasites life is in the environment, and both survival of the parasite as well as developing into an infective oocysts depends on these factors. The time from when the parasite has left the animal in the faeces inside an oocyst and has developed in to a parasite that can infect new animals, is called the sporulation time. Temperatures above 15 degrees Celsius and humidity above 80% are favorable conditions that lowers the time for the oocyst to become infective, which can lead to regular outbreaks of coccidiosis.
