= Eimeria acervulina =

Scientific classification
- Domain: Eukaryota
- Clade: Diaphoretickes
- Clade: SAR
- Clade: Alveolata
- Phylum: Apicomplexa
- Class: Conoidasida
- Order: Eucoccidiorida
- Family: Eimeriidae
- Genus: Eimeria
- Species: E. acervulina

Binomial name
- Eimeria acervulina Tyzzer, 1929

Species of single-celled organism

Eimeria acervulina is a species of Eimeria that causes coccidiosis in poultry worldwide. Affected birds tend to appear depressed with reduced appetite, diarrhea, and depigmentation. Diagnosis is made by necropsy based on lesions in the upper third of the small intestine, and the appearance of white or grey striations along the intestinal mucosa. Scrapings of the mucosa from diseased birds can reveal oocysts.
