= Frederick Brundrett =

British civil servant and mathematician (1894–1974)

Frederick Brundrett KCB KBE
- Born: 25 November 1894; Ebbw Vale, Monmouthshire, Wales
- Died: 1 August 1974 (aged 79); Southbourne, Sussex, England
- Education: University of Cambridge (BA)
- Awards: Companion of the Order of the Bath (1946); Knight Commander of the Order of the British Empire (1950); Knight Commander of the Order of the Bath (1956)
- Scientific career
- Workplaces: Royal Naval Scientific Service; Ministry of Defence

Sir Frederick Brundrett, KCB KBE (25 November 1894 – 1 August 1974) was a British civil servant and mathematician who served as the Chief Scientific Adviser to the Ministry of Defence from 1954 to 1959.

== Education and early life ==
Frederick Brundrett was born in Sunny Bank, Ebbw Vale, Monmouthshire on 25 November 1894. He was the oldest child of the seven sons and three daughters of Walter Brundrett, an accountant who worked for the Ebbw Vale Steel, Iron and Coal Company, and his wife Ada née Richardson. He was educated at Rossall School, a public school in Fleetwood, Lancashire, where he excelled at sports. Later in life he was said to be one of the country's oldest first-class field hockey players. Although the school was not renowned for mathematics, Brundrett won a mathematics scholarship to Sidney Sussex College, Cambridge, which he entered in 1913. He earned first class honours in the first part of the Mathematical Tripos in 1914 and became a Wrangler in 1916.

== Career ==
Brundrett joined the Royal Naval Volunteer Reserve to participate in World War I. He was slated for duty on patrol boats but contracted mumps and was held in isolation. It was discovered that he was a Wrangler and he was reassigned to the Wireless Experimental Department at HMS Vernon, where he spent the rest of the war. Demobilised in 1919, Brundrett, joined the scientific staff of the Royal Naval Signal School. In 1920 he married Enid James; they had one child, a son they named James Edward.

Brundrett remained at the Royal Naval Signal School until 1937, when he was transferred to the headquarters of the Royal Naval Scientific Service in London as Principal Scientific Officer in the Department of Scientific Research and Experiment (DSRE). He became the superintending scientist in 1940, assistant director in 1941 and deputy director in 1943. He created a system for categorising scientists, made arrangements with the Treasury for them to be directly appointed to civil service positions and obtained rapid security clearances for them. He recruited some 10,000 scientists to the war effort at the Admiralty, the War Office, the Air Ministry and the Ministry of Supply. His son James, a lieutenant in the Royal Artillery, was killed in Italy on 30 September 1944. For his wartime work, Brundrett was appointed a Companion of the Order of the Bath in the 1946 New Year Honours.

When Sir Charles Wright retired in 1947, Brundrett succeeded him as the Chief of the Royal Naval Scientific Service. He chose William Cook as his Director of Physical Research. The year 1947 also saw the formation of the Defence Research Policy Committee (DRPC) to advise the Minister of Defence and the Chiefs of Staff on matters of scientific policy, of which Brundrett became an ex officio member. The DRPC was initially chaired by the Chief Scientific Adviser to the Ministry of Defence, Sir Henry Tizard. Brundrett became deputy chairman in 1950 and chairman in 1954 succeeding, Sir John Cockcroft as Chief Scientific Adviser. He was also Honorary Scientific Adviser to the Ministry of Civil Aviation from 1953 to 1959. Brundrett was appointed a Knight Commander of the Order of the British Empire in the 1950 New Year Honours and a Knight Commander of the Order of the Bath in the 1956 New Year Honours. He became an honorary fellow of Sidney Sussex College in 1954 and received an honorary DSc from the University of Manchester in 1956.

Brundrett retired from the Ministry of Defence in 1959 and was succeeded by Sir Solly Zuckerman. He was a Civil Service Commissioner from 1960 to 1967, chairman of the Air Traffic Control Board from 1959 to 1974 and chairman of the naval aircraft research committee of the Aeronautical Research Council from 1960 to 1966. He was chairman of the council of the Red and White Friesian Cattle Society, president of the Agricultural Co-operative Association, chairman of trustees for the Rural Industries Bureau from 1961 to 1966, a member of the White Fish Authority from 1961 to 1973 and chairman of the Board of Governors for Houghton Poultry Research Station from 1962 to 1968.

Brundrett died in Southbourne, Sussex on 1 August 1974. His papers are in the Churchill Archives Centre.
