= Eimeria necatrix =

Scientific classification
- Domain: Eukaryota
- Clade: Diaphoretickes
- Clade: SAR
- Clade: Alveolata
- Phylum: Apicomplexa
- Class: Conoidasida
- Order: Eucoccidiorida
- Family: Eimeriidae
- Genus: Eimeria
- Species: E. necatrix

Binomial name
- Eimeria necatrix Johnson, 1930

Species of single-celled organism

Eimeria necatrix is a species of Eimeria that causes very severe intestinal coccidiosis in older poultry characterized by congestion, hemorrhage, necrosis of the intestine and bloody feces. Very large schizonts can be seen as white or yellow dots and oocysts can be found occasionally in the ceca.
