= Eimeria fraterculae =

Scientific classification
- Domain: Eukaryota
- Clade: Diaphoretickes
- Clade: SAR
- Clade: Alveolata
- Phylum: Apicomplexa
- Class: Conoidasida
- Order: Eucoccidiorida
- Family: Eimeriidae
- Genus: Eimeria
- Species: E. fraterculae

Binomial name
- Eimeria fraterculae Leighton and Gajadhar, 1986

Species of single-celled organism

Eimeria fraterculae is a species of alveolates belonging to the family Eimeriidae. It causes renal coccidiosis in the Atlantic puffin (Fratercula arctica).

Apart from its host-specificity, this coccidium can be recognised by the subspherical oocytes with unusually thick walls appearing distinctly greenish in colour. Coccidiosis caused by this parasite appears to be mild and nonfatal.
