= Peter Martin Biggs =

British scientist

Peter Martin Biggs FRS (13 August 1926 — 27 December 2021) was a British scientist who specialised in avian infectious disease. He is known particularly for his work on Marek's disease in poultry, and the development of a vaccine for the virus-caused disease.

Peter grew up in Hampshire, but was evacuated to Harvard, Massachusetts in 1940 for four years. Upon returning to the UK, he joined the RAF, before turning his interests to animals, becoming a veterinary student at Royal Veterinary College, London. His research career was then initiated with a PhD at Bristol University, studying cancer and domestic fowl.

Peter joined the Houghton Poultry Research Station in 1959 (later becoming Director in 1973), where he followed his interest in viruses and cancer. Here he recognised that avian leukosis was composed of two diseases: Marek's disease and lymphoid leukosis. Study of Marek's disease and the underlying virus would lead to a successful vaccine. Upon the closure of Houghton in 1992, Peter was appointed Director of the newly formed Institute of Animal Health, Compton, where he would remain until retirement.

Peter had roles with the Institute of Biology and the Animal Health Trust, as well as with the World Veterinary Poultry Association and its journal Avian Pathology. He was elected a Fellow of the Royal Society in 1976, and was awarded the Wolf Prize in Agriculture in 1989.
