= E. palustris =

E. palustris may refer to:

- Eimeria palustris, an apicomplexan parasite species that infects the marsh rice rat
- Eleocharis palustris, the common spike-rush, creeping spike-rush or marsh spike-rush, a plant species growing in wetlands throughout the Boreal Kingdom
- Epipactis palustris, the marsh helleborine, an orchid species
