= Eimeria kinsellai =

Scientific classification
- Domain: Eukaryota
- Clade: Sar
- Clade: Alveolata
- Phylum: Apicomplexa
- Class: Conoidasida
- Order: Eucoccidiorida
- Family: Eimeriidae
- Genus: Eimeria
- Species: E. kinsellai

Binomial name
- Eimeria kinsellai Barnard, Ernst, and Roper, 1971

Species of single-celled organism

Eimeria kinsellai is an apicomplexan parasite of the genus Eimeria that infects the marsh rice rat (Oryzomys palustris). It was discovered in 1970 at Paynes Prairie, Alachua County, Florida. A different Eimeria, Eimeria palustris, has been found in Alabama marsh rice rats. E. kinsellai differs from other Eimeria found in rice rats, such as Eimeria couesii, Eimeria oryzomysi, Eimeria ojastii, and E. palustris, in anatomical details. It was named after parasitologist John M. Kinsella.

== Literature cited ==
- Barnard, W.P., Ernst, J.V. and Roper, R.A. 1971a. Eimeria kinsellai sp. n. (Protozoa: Eimeriidae) in a marsh rice rat Oryzomys palustris from Florida. Journal of Protozoology 18(3):546–547.
- Barnard, W.P., Ernst, J.V. and Stevens, R.O. 1971b. Eimeria palustris sp. n. and Isospora hammondi sp. n. (Coccidia: Eimeriidae) from the marsh rice rat, Oryzomys palustris (Harlan) (subscription required). The Journal of Parasitology 57(6):1293–1296.
