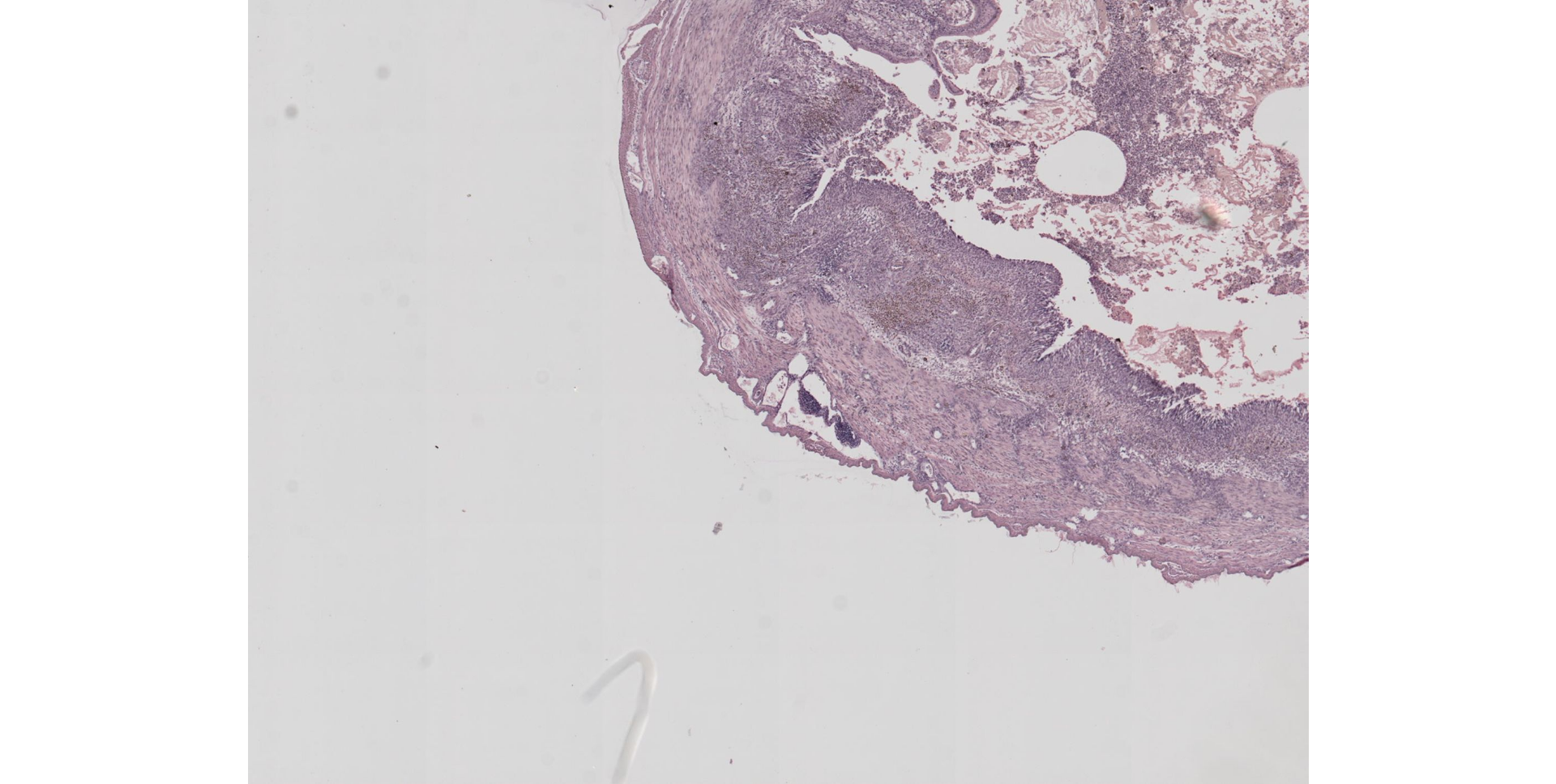
- Eimeria tenella

Scientific classification
- Domain: Eukaryota
- Clade: Diaphoretickes
- Clade: Sar
- Clade: Alveolata
- Phylum: Apicomplexa
- Class: Conoidasida
- Order: Eucoccidiorida
- Family: Eimeriidae
- Genus: Eimeria
- Species: E. tenella

Binomial name
- Eimeria tenella (Tyzzer, 1929)

= Eimeria tenella =

Species of single-celled organism

Eimeria tenella is a species of Eimeria that causes hemorrhagic cecal coccidiosis in young poultry. It is found worldwide.

== Description ==
This species has a monoxenous life cycle with the only definitive host as chickens; it is extremely host-specific. Acquired via fecal contamination of food and water (oral-fecal route), it undergoes endogenous merogony in the crypts of Lieberkuhn (intestinal ceca of chicken) and gametogony in epithelial cells of the small intestines. Fusion of microgamete and macrogamete forms results in unsporulated zygotes, which are released with feces of chicken. The zygote sporulates after one to five days, and becomes infective.

Diagnosis is based on finding oocysts in feces. While no effective treatment exists, the rate of infection can be reduced via prophylactics, anticoccidial drugs and vaccination of baby chicks.

== Life cycle ==
Eimeria tenella has a monogenetic life cycle, that is, the life cycle involves a single host. Various stages of its complicated life cycle may conveniently be described under two phases, asexual cycle or schizogony and sexual cycle involving gametogony. Much of life cycle is intracellular. It is one of seven protozoan parasites that cause avian coccidiosis in poultry.

== Acquiring the infection ==
The unsporulated oocyst is shed from an infected bird in the feces. This exposure to air and moisture triggers meiosis and cell division. After 9–12 hours of sporulation (asexual reproduction by the production and release of spores) eight haploid sporozoites are formed. It has completed the sporulation stage after about 24 hours and can now infect a new host.

=== Schizogony ===
The chicken ingests the sporozoite where it is stripped of its oocyst wall by abrasion in the gizzard and breakdown in the lumen of the small intestine. The sporozoite then migrates to its preferred site of development (the caeca in the case of Eimeria tenella) and invades the villus enterocyte. It then migrates to the crypt of the villus where it will complete development. There are two generations of schizonts and merozoites which are morphologically distinguishable. The sporozoites undergo two waves of schizogeny (asexual reproduction) in the crypts and produce many first and second generation merozoites. These merozoites can invade locally and reproduce themselves to produce a smaller variety of schizonts. The sporozoites are then shed in the feces and the process begins again.

==== Infection by sporozoites ====
The beginning of complex life cycle of Eimeria tenella may be taken to be initiated by infection of epithelial cells of host cecum by sporozoites. The infected fowl passes out oocysts or zygocysts with fecal matter. When their oocysts are swallowed by a new or healthy bird, its gizzard and digestive juices dissolve the cyst wall and release sporozoites which enter the host epithelial cells. Within the epithelial cells, the sporozoites grow in size and multiply by schizogony.

==== Sporozoite ====
It is the earliest intracellular stage of parasite. It is elongated, slightly curved, microscopic unicellular organism with one end pointed and the other end blunt. The pellicle, forming external envelope, contains longitudinally arranged contractile microtubules which help in wriggling movements of organism. Cytoplasm includes a vesicular nucleus, a mitochondrion, golgi bodies, endoplasmic reticulum, ribosomes, lysosomes and vacuoles containing reserve food, etc. Penetration of sporozoite into host epithelial cell is facilitated by the lytic secretion stored in rhoptries of parasite. The measurement of body is as 19.5–25 by 16.5–23 micrometer.

== See also ==
- Houghton Poultry Research Station
