= Eimeria falciformis =

Scientific classification
- Domain: Eukaryota
- Clade: Sar
- Clade: Alveolata
- Phylum: Apicomplexa
- Class: Conoidasida
- Order: Eucoccidiorida
- Family: Eimeriidae
- Genus: Eimeria
- Species: E. falciformis

Binomial name
- Eimeria falciformis Eimer, 1870

Synonyms
- Eimeria pragensis

Species of protist

Eimeria falciformis is an obligate intracellular parasite that primarily infects the mouse species Mus musculus. As part of the Apicomplexa phylum, it has a complex life cycle within its host, causing tissue necrosis and inflammation, particularly in the cecum. This leads to coccidiosis, a disease characterized by symptoms like diarrhoea and weight loss. E. falciformis is one of over 1,700 species in the Eimeria genus, which infects the intestinal epithelial cells of various animals, including poultry and livestock.

== Life cycle ==
Transmission occurs via oocysts, which are shed in faeces. Under suitable environmental conditions—such as proper temperature, humidity, and oxygen levels—these oocysts sporulate. When a new host ingests sporulated oocysts, sporozoites are released and invade the cecal epithelial cells. Inside the host, sporozoites develop into trophozoites and then merozoites, which undergo rounds of asexual reproduction (schizogony), leading to host cell rupture. Some merozoites become sexual gametes, which fuse to form unsporulated oocysts. These are excreted in faeces, completing the life cycle.

== Pathology and disease ==
Infected mice develop coccidiosis, which manifests through diarrhoea and weight loss due to cecal epithelial destruction. Disease severity depends on factors such as infection dose, the host's age, and immune status. The short, single-host (monoxenous) life cycle of E. falciformis makes it a valuable model for studying parasitic infections and host-parasite interactions in vivo.

== Research importance ==
The Eimeria falciformis–mouse model is widely used to study intracellular parasitism, including schizogony, gametogenesis, and oocyst formation. It provides valuable insights into coccidiosis in poultry and livestock caused by other Eimeria species. Researchers also use this model to study host-pathogen interactions, mucosal immunity, and immune responses to parasitic infections.

With a relatively small genome of 44 Mb across 14 chromosomes, E. falciformis has been the focus of genomic studies that reveal its adaptation to a single host. Research shows that it exploits host metabolic pathways, such as tryptophan catabolism, to sustain its life cycle. The E. falciformis model remains central to efforts aimed at developing antiparasitic treatments for coccidiosis in economically important animals.
