= Eimeria brunetti =

Scientific classification
- Domain: Eukaryota
- Clade: Sar
- Clade: Alveolata
- Phylum: Apicomplexa
- Class: Conoidasida
- Order: Eucoccidiorida
- Family: Eimeriidae
- Genus: Eimeria
- Species: E. brunetti

Binomial name
- Eimeria brunetti Levine, 1942

Species of single-celled organism

Eimeria brunetti is a species of Eimeria that causes hemorrhagic intestinal coccidiosis in poultry worldwide. Lesions are limited to lower small intestine.
