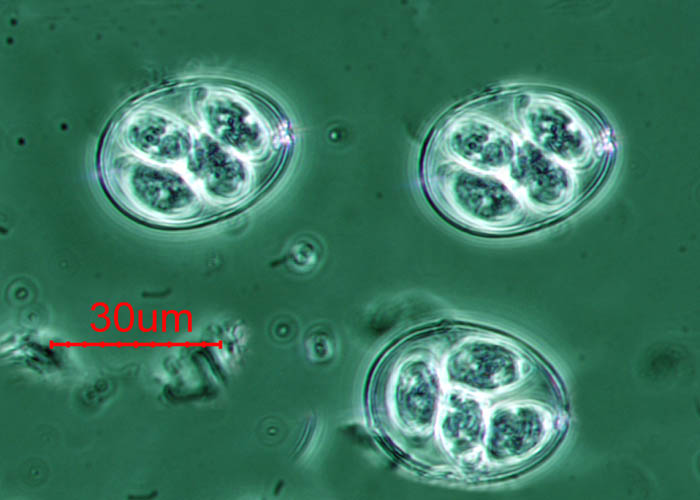
- Eimeria maxima oocysts

Scientific classification
- Domain: Eukaryota
- Clade: Diaphoretickes
- Clade: SAR
- Clade: Alveolata
- Phylum: Apicomplexa
- Class: Conoidasida
- Order: Eucoccidiorida
- Family: Eimeriidae
- Genus: Eimeria
- Species: E. maxima

Binomial name
- Eimeria maxima Tyzzer, 1929

= Eimeria maxima =

Species of single-celled organism

Eimeria maxima is a protozoan that causes coccidiosis in poultry. It is located in the middle part of the intestine, on either side of Meckel's diverticulum, and frequently ascends into the duodenum. The lesions it causes are limited to the middle of the small intestine.
