= Houghton Poultry Research Station =

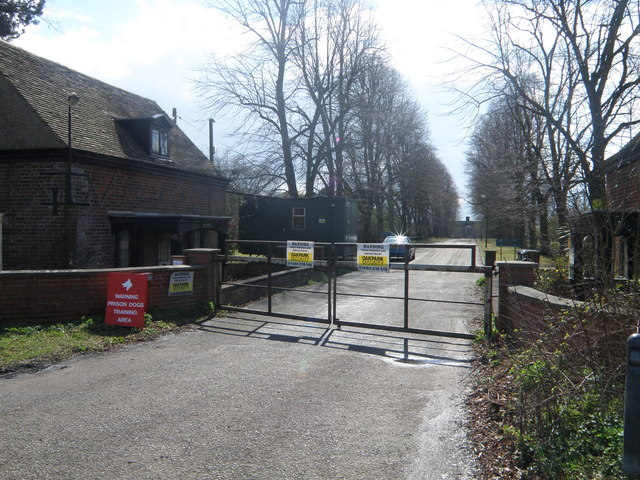
- The entrance in March 2009

- Location within Cambridgeshire
- Former names: Houghton Laboratory

General information
- Type: Agricultural research institute
- Location: Houghton, Cambridgeshire PE17 2DA
- Coordinates: 52.334°N 0.1°W
- Elevation: 15 m (49 ft)
- Completed: 1948
- Inaugurated: 1948
- Demolished: 1992

The Houghton Poultry Research Station was a poultry disease research station in northern Cambridgeshire.

By the 1970s, the site was the largest centre for poultry disease in the world.

== History ==
Houghton Poultry Research Station was founded by the UK Animal Health Trust in 1948 as one of “a group of research stations devoted to the study of problems connected with farm livestock, each devoted to a single species but catering as a group for the needs of similar livestock such as goats, rabbits poultry and pigeons, as well as those of larger farm animals” Dr Robert Fraser Gordon, a successful research worker and champion of the UK poultry industry, was appointed as the first director. He established what was to become a world-renowned centre for the study of infectious diseases of poultry from two ex-prisoner-war huts in the grounds of Houghton Grange in Huntingdonshire, near Cambridge. It was government-run from 1956. On the board was Emmanuel Amoroso, Sir Kenneth Mather (vice-chancellor from 1965 to 1971 of the University of Southampton) and Trevor Stamp, 3rd Baron Stamp. The virologist Prof Peter Wildy was a chairman of the site.

The first programme included work on contemporary scourges of the UK poultry industry: salmonellosis, coccidiosis, fowl paralysis (as Marek's disease was then called) and virus diseases. Fowl pest (Newcastle disease) was not included as disease control facilities were inadequate. By 1949 new purpose-built laboratories had been erected and staff at the research station began their work. At the time fowl paralysis was a major problem of developing poultry industries around the world. For instance, in 1947 of the chickens over 8 weeks of age submitted for post mortem to the UK Central Veterinary Laboratories 14.2% had the disease and by 1949 this figure reached 20.4%. The problem was compounded as chickens with fowl paralysis (Marek's disease) had visceral lymphoma and this was confused with lymphoid leukosis. The two diseases, with completely different aetiologies, were included together under the general term ‘Avian Leukosis Complex’ leading to much confusion for diagnosticians and pathologists. Throughout the 1950s debate raged over the causes of different syndromes within the Avian Leukosis Complex, if it was transmitted vertically or by contact and if it could only be controlled by selective breeding, as recommended by some researchers at Cornell University. There was some hope for development of a diagnostic test; however, this proved a false dawn and reliable diagnostic tests were developed much later. Even as early as 1949, there was talk of the developing a vaccine.

Facilities for working on infectious diseases at Houghton in the 1950s were primitive but plans were ambitious, even to the extent of developing a mobile laboratory to house a ‘flying squad’ to investigate disease outbreaks on farms. Experimental facilities improved as birds began to be kept in isolation in purpose-built facilities. In addition, new permanent laboratories were built onto Houghton Grange, which provided the centre for administration and a library.

In 1959 Peter Biggs was employed to head the Leucosis Experimental Unit (LEU) devoted to unravelling the problems of lymphoid leukosis and fowl paralysis and ambitious plans were set in train for purpose-built complex of isolation laboratories and the production of disease-free chickens from another isolation unit built at Boxworth, some 8 miles away.

1961 saw the culmination of many years of confusion, when Biggs and Campbell proposed that the leukosis complex and fowl paralysis be separately classified. At the First World's Poultry Science Conference in Utrecht, Netherlands it was agreed that fowl paralysis be called Marek's disease as a tribute to József Marek who had provided the first published description

In the 1960s LEU team was joined by a number of very able researchers including Tony Churchill and Jim (L.N.) Payne. This proved a very productive period for research on Marek's disease with collaborations, and friendly rivalry, between laboratories on both sides of the Atlantic. In 1967 the investment at Houghton paid dividends when the causative agent of Marek's disease, a highly cell-associated lymphotropic herpesvirus, was identified. This was hailed by the press as a major breakthrough, which had implications for the study of human as well as animal tumour immunology. Although the causative virus was now identified there was still no means of prevention and the threat from acute Marek's disease assumed huge proportions with half of the birds succumbing in some flocks and losses in excess of 25% being frequent. Poultry diseases including Marek's were costing the industry a staggering 20% of annual farm income in 1969. At the time selecting for genetic resistance to Marek's disease was the only means of defence.Techniques developed to grow the Marek's disease herpesvirus in chicken kidney cells enabled researchers to attenuate virulent virus and develop the first effective vaccine. This was the first report of an anti-viral vaccine being used to effectively prevent a naturally occurring cancer.

The site became known in 1986 as the Houghton Laboratory of the Institute for Animal Health. The site closed in the 1992 due to budget realignments. It had been planned to close the site in August 1989.

=== Research ===
In 1949 it found a strain of Eimeria tenella known as the Houghton strain, which allowed the researchers to study the Eimeria lifecycle. The site also researched coccidiosis.

It worked in the 1960s with the British Egg Marketing Board, collaborating with the University of Liverpool on research on avian infectious bronchitis.

It developed a vaccine for Marek's disease in the 1960s. In 1967 this disease was costing the industry £7m or about 2.5% of revenue.

Peter Biggs attended the 1967 World Poultry Congress in Kiev. He showed that cancer in poultry was heritable, due to the cancer complex of Leucosis, Marek's disease and acute Marek's disease. Leucosis alone caused 40% of mortality in egg-producing breeds.

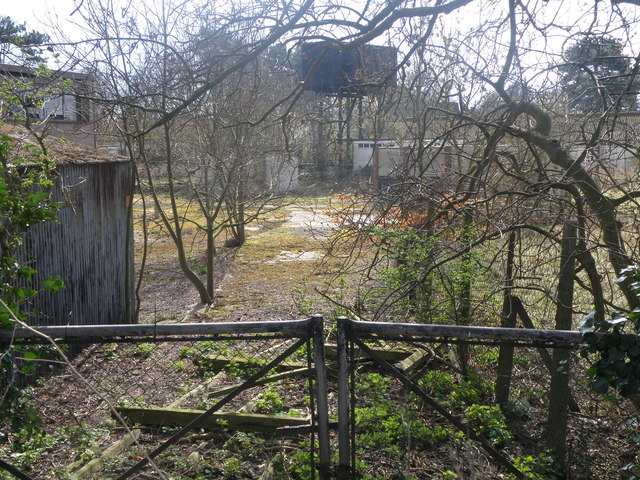
The site in March 2009

Herbert Williams-Smith FRS was head of microbiology until May 1984. In 1969 a report on antibiotic growth promoters (AGPs) recommended a restriction of tetracycline, due to antibiotic resistance, which had been investigated by Herbert Williams-Smith in the early 1970s.

=== Directors ===
- Robert Fraser Gordon 1948 - 1974
- Peter Biggs January 1974 - (became FRS in March 1976)
- Jim Payne 1986 - 1992

== Structure ==
It was sited in Huntingdonshire off the A1123 near the junction with the B1090 Sawtry Way. The site has been redeveloped.

It had 33 laboratories. Its chickens laid around 2000 eggs a week.

== See also ==
- Avian Pathology, journal
- British Poultry Science, journal
- British Society of Animal Science
- Microbiology Society
- National Animal Disease Information Service
