= Eimeria nieschulzi =

Scientific classification
- Domain: Eukaryota
- Clade: Diaphoretickes
- Clade: SAR
- Clade: Alveolata
- Phylum: Apicomplexa
- Class: Conoidasida
- Order: Eucoccidiorida
- Family: Eimeriidae
- Genus: Eimeria
- Species: E. nieschulzi

Binomial name
- Eimeria nieschulzi Dieben,1924

Species of single-celled organism

Eimeria nieschulzi is an apicomplexan parasite of the genus Eimeria that infects the brown rat (Rattus norvegicus).
