= Eimeria palustris =

Scientific classification
- Domain: Eukaryota
- Clade: Sar
- Clade: Alveolata
- Phylum: Apicomplexa
- Class: Conoidasida
- Order: Eucoccidiorida
- Family: Eimeriidae
- Genus: Eimeria
- Species: E. palustris

Binomial name
- Eimeria palustris Barnard, Ernst, and Stevens, 1971

Species of single-celled organism

Eimeria palustris is an apicomplexan parasite of the genus Eimeria that infects the marsh rice rat (Oryzomys palustris). It was discovered in 1970 at Tuskegee National Forest, Macon County, Alabama. A different Eimeria, Eimeria kinsellai, has been found in Florida marsh rice rats. E. palustris differs from other Eimeria found in rice rats, such as Eimeria couesii, Eimeria oryzomysi, Eimeria ojastii, and E. kinsellai, in anatomical details. Its specific epithet refers to that of its type host, Oryzomys palustris.

== Literature cited ==
- Barnard, W.P., Ernst, J.V. and Stevens, R.O. 1971. Eimeria palustris sp. n. and Isospora hammondi sp. n. (Coccidia: Eimeriidae) from the marsh rice rat, Oryzomys palustris (Harlan) (subscription required). The Journal of Parasitology 57(6):1293–1296.
