= Eimeria meleagridis =

Scientific classification
- Domain: Eukaryota
- Clade: Diaphoretickes
- Clade: SAR
- Clade: Alveolata
- Phylum: Apicomplexa
- Class: Conoidasida
- Order: Eucoccidiorida
- Family: Eimeriidae
- Genus: Eimeria
- Species: E. meleagridis

Binomial name
- Eimeria meleagridis Tyzzer, 1927

Species of single-celled organism

Eimeria meleagridis is a species of coccidia found worldwide, which causes mild disease in young turkeys aged 4–8 weeks. The parasite causes disease in the cecum, where, on post-mortem examination (necropsy), a cream-colored exudate is seen.
