= Eimeria bufomarini =

Scientific classification
- Domain: Eukaryota
- Clade: Sar
- Clade: Alveolata
- Phylum: Apicomplexa
- Class: Conoidasida
- Order: Eucoccidiorida
- Family: Eimeriidae
- Genus: Eimeria
- Species: E. bufomarini

Binomial name
- Eimeria bufomarini Paperna & Lainson, 1995

Species of single-celled organism

Eimeria bufomarini is a species of coccidium, known to infect the epithelial cells of the intestines of Brazilian cane toads.
