= Chief Scientific Adviser to the Ministry of Defence =

UK government appointment

The Chief Scientific Adviser to the UK's Ministry of Defence is responsible for providing strategic management of science and technology issues in the MOD, most directly through the MOD research budget of well over £1 billion, and sits as a full member of the Defence Management Board and the Defence Council, the two most senior management boards within the MOD. There is also a Chief Scientific Adviser (Nuclear), responsible for the MOD’s nuclear science and technology programme, currently held by Professor Bill Lee.

== List of MOD Chief Scientific Advisers ==
- Sir Henry Tizard, 1946–1952
- Sir John Cockcroft, 1952–1954
- Sir Frederick Brundrett, 1954–1960
- Sir Solly Zuckerman, 1960–1965
- Sir Alan Cottrell, 1966–1967
- Sir William Cook, 1966–1970
- Sir Hermann Bondi, 1971–1977
- Sir Ronald Mason, 1977–1983
- Sir Richard Oswald Chandler Norman, 1983–1988
- Sir Ronald Oxburgh, 1988–1993
- Sir David Davies, 1993–1999
- Sir Keith O'Nions, 2000–2004
- Sir Roy Anderson, 2004–2008
- Sir Mark Welland, 2008–2012
- Professor Vernon Gibson, 2012–2016
- Hugh F. Durrant-Whyte, 2017–2018
- Simon Cholerton, 2018–2019 (interim)
- Dame Angela McLean 2019–2023
- Professor Vernon Gibson, 2023−present

== See also ==
- Frederick Lindemann, 1st Viscount Cherwell
