= Bighead goby =

Bighead goby may refer to:

- Drombus globiceps, also known as the Kranji drombus, a species of goby from the western Indo-Pacific
- Ponticola kessleri, also known as Kessler's goby, a species of goby native to Eurasia
