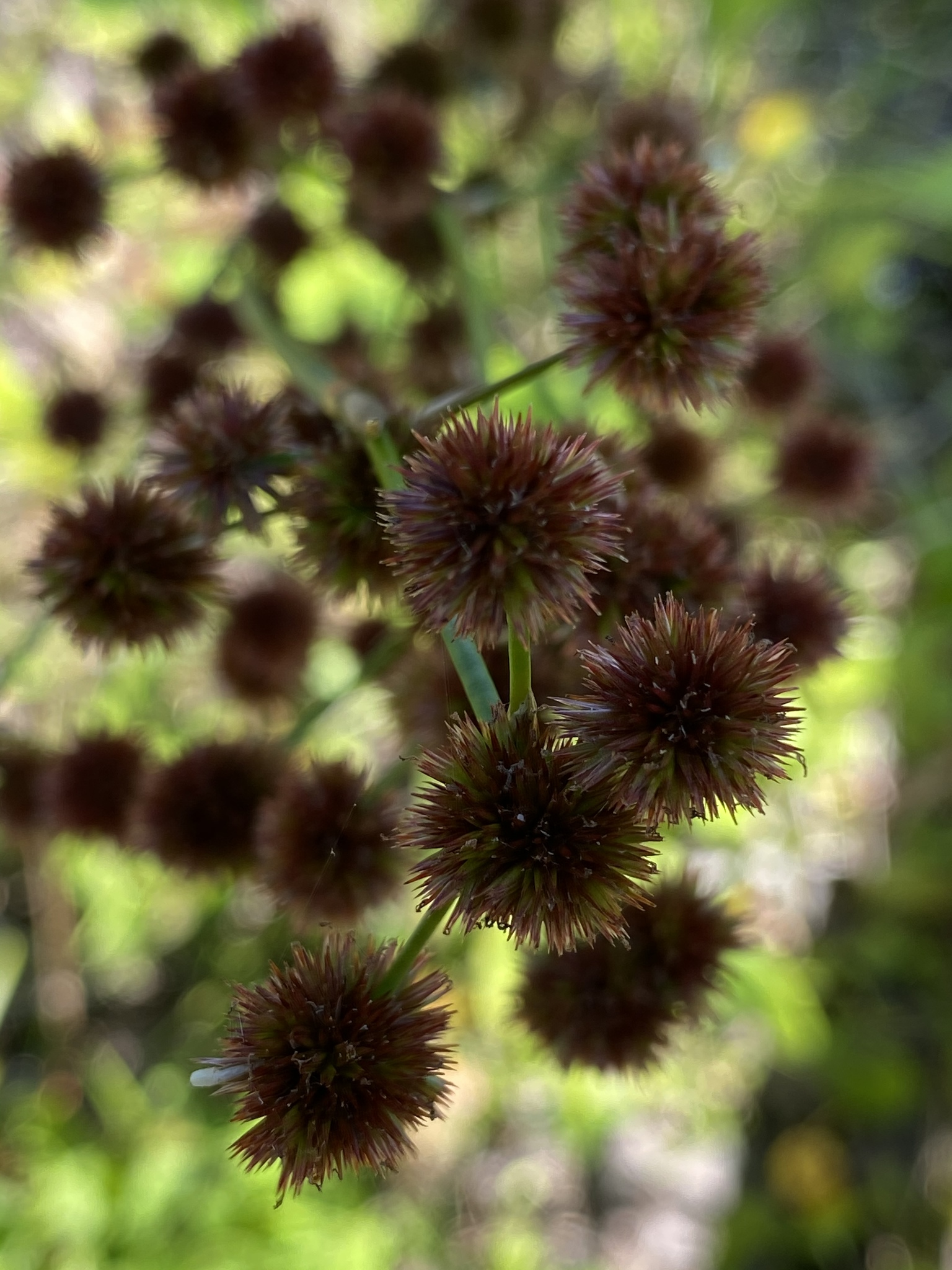
- Bighead rush in IRB, Florida

Scientific classification
- Kingdom: Plantae
- Clade: Tracheophytes
- Clade: Angiosperms
- Clade: Monocots
- Clade: Commelinids
- Order: Poales
- Family: Juncaceae
- Genus: Juncus
- Species: J. megacephalus

Binomial name
- Juncus megacephalus M.A.Curtis

Synonyms
- Juncus scirpoides var. carolinianus Coville; Juncus scirpoides var. echinatus Engelm.

= Juncus megacephalus =

Species of flowering plant known as a rush

Juncus megacephalus, the bighead rush, is a plant species native to the United States. It is known from every seacoast state from Texas to Maryland, as well as Massachusetts, growing in freshwater marshes, sand dunes, and disturbed sites at elevations less than 100 meters (330 ft).

Juncus megacephalus is a perennial herb spreading by means of underground rhizomes. Erect stems are round in cross-section, 3–4 mm (0.12–0.16 in) in diameter, up to 110 cm (43 in) tall. Leaves are up to 24 cm (9.4 in) long. Inflorescence is a panicle of up to 20 heads. Each head is spherical, about 10 mm (0.39 in) in diameter, with about 50 flowers. Flowers are straw-colored, about 20 mm (0.79 in) in diameter.
