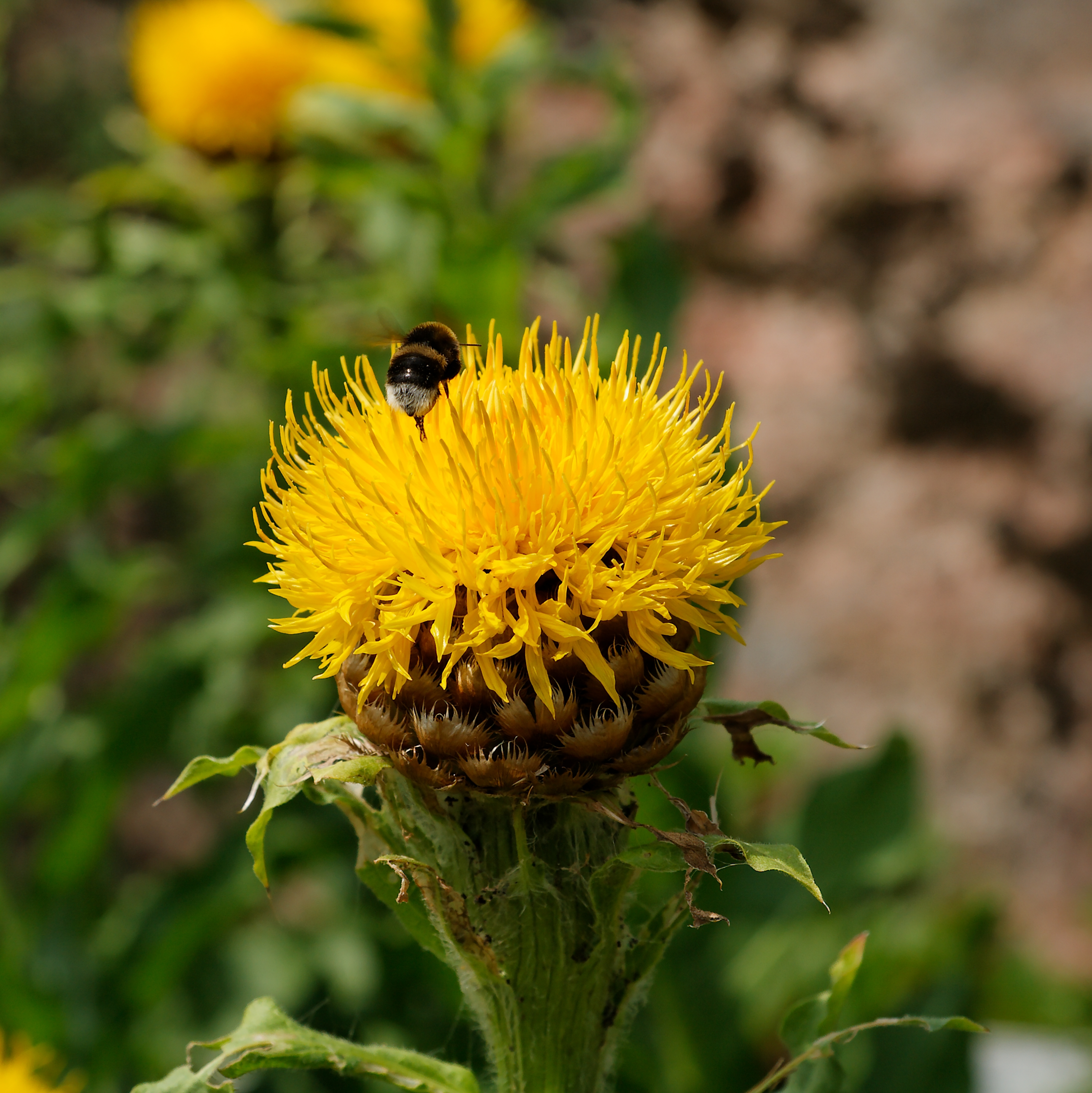

Scientific classification
- Kingdom: Plantae
- Clade: Tracheophytes
- Clade: Angiosperms
- Clade: Eudicots
- Clade: Asterids
- Order: Asterales
- Family: Asteraceae
- Genus: Centaurea
- Species: C. macrocephala

Binomial name
- Centaurea macrocephala Muss. Puschk. ex Willd. 1803

Synonyms
- Grossheimia macrocephala

= Centaurea macrocephala =

Species of flowering plant

Centaurea macrocephala is a species of flowering plant in the family Asteraceae, and a member of the thistle tribe, Cardueae (Cynareae). It has many common names, including bighead knapweed, big yellow centaurea, lemon fluff, yellow bachelor's button, yellow hardhat, and Armenian basketflower.

This plant is native to the Caucasus. It is known throughout much of the world as an introduced species and sometimes a noxious weed. It is a popular garden plant, and is widely available for cultivation as an ornamental.

== Description ==
This herbaceous perennial bears mostly unbranched stems reaching up to 170 cm tall. The leaves are variable in shape and size. Those near the base have oval blades borne on petioles and those higher on the plant have shorter, narrower blades. The flower heads are solitary atop the stems and have arrays of small leaves around the bases. The heads are 2.5 to 3.5 cm wide. The somewhat rounded head is covered in layers of phyllaries with fringed tips and sometimes spines. The head contains many yellow florets. The fruit, including its pappus, can be well over one centimeter long.

== Biology ==
In its native range in the Caucasus, this plant grows in mountain meadows. It is a summer-flowering subalpine species. It thrives as an introduced species in many types of moist temperate habitat, especially areas dominated by perennial herbs. It can grow in disturbed areas.

== Uses ==
This is a well-known ornamental flowering plant. It has been a garden flower for over 200 years, being introduced to the United Kingdom and United States in the early 19th century. Thomas Jefferson obtained seeds from the nurseryman Bernard McMahon and planted them at Monticello.

In gardens it can be placed at borders or corners, where it will form clumps. It is used as a cut flower for its large, rounded heads with long yellow florets, and it can be used as a decorative dried flower. This is the largest Centaurea in cultivation and is easily recognized.

== Ecology ==
As the plant has been transported around the world for ornamental use it has taken hold as an introduced species in several areas. It is a casual garden escapee in parts of Europe and North America. It has only become a troublesome noxious weed in a few areas, notably Washington state in the United States, where it is prohibited to buy or sell the species. Its invasive nature is best seen in garden environments, where it is more aggressive than most other ornamental plants and can become a "garden thug".

== Gallery ==
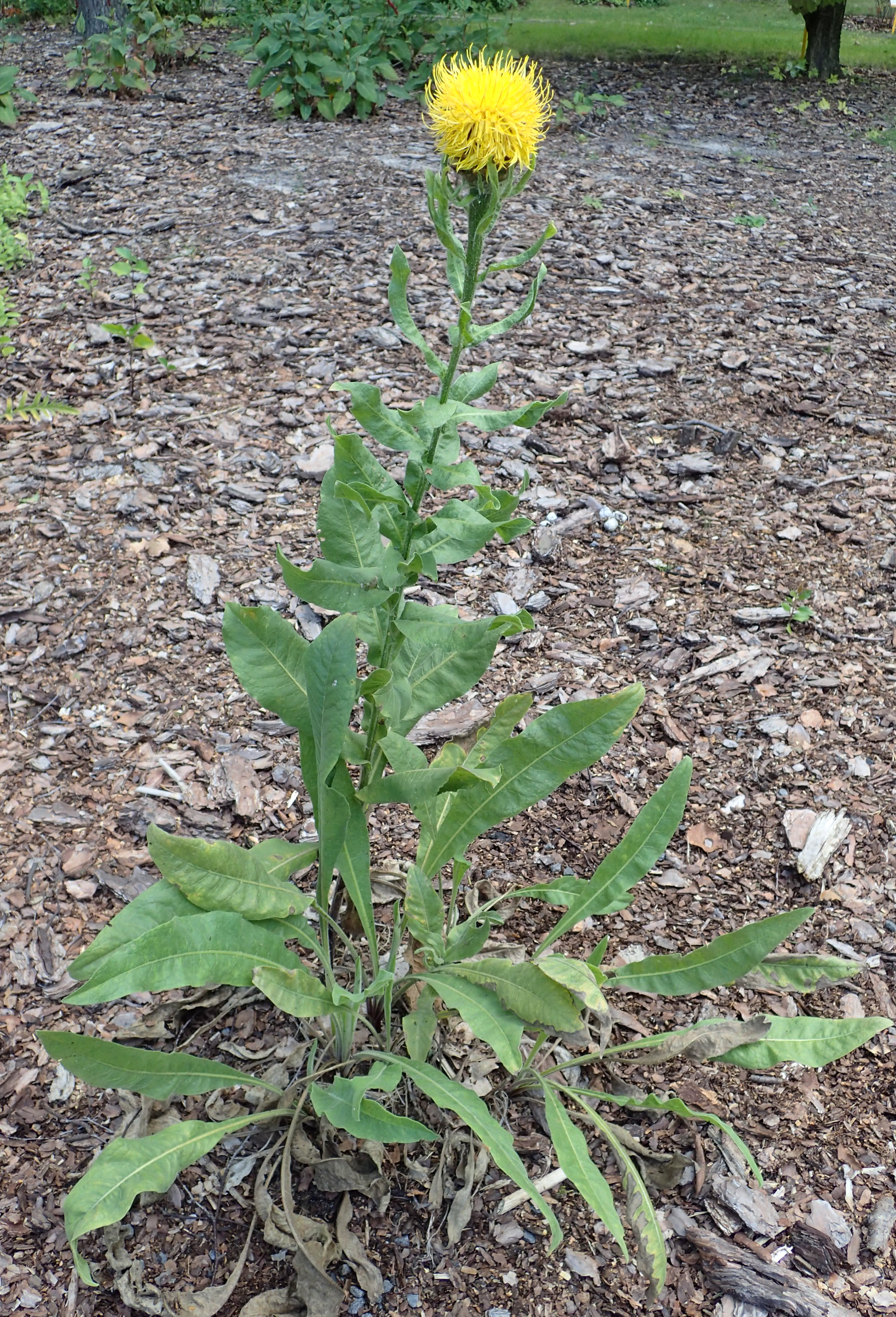
Form

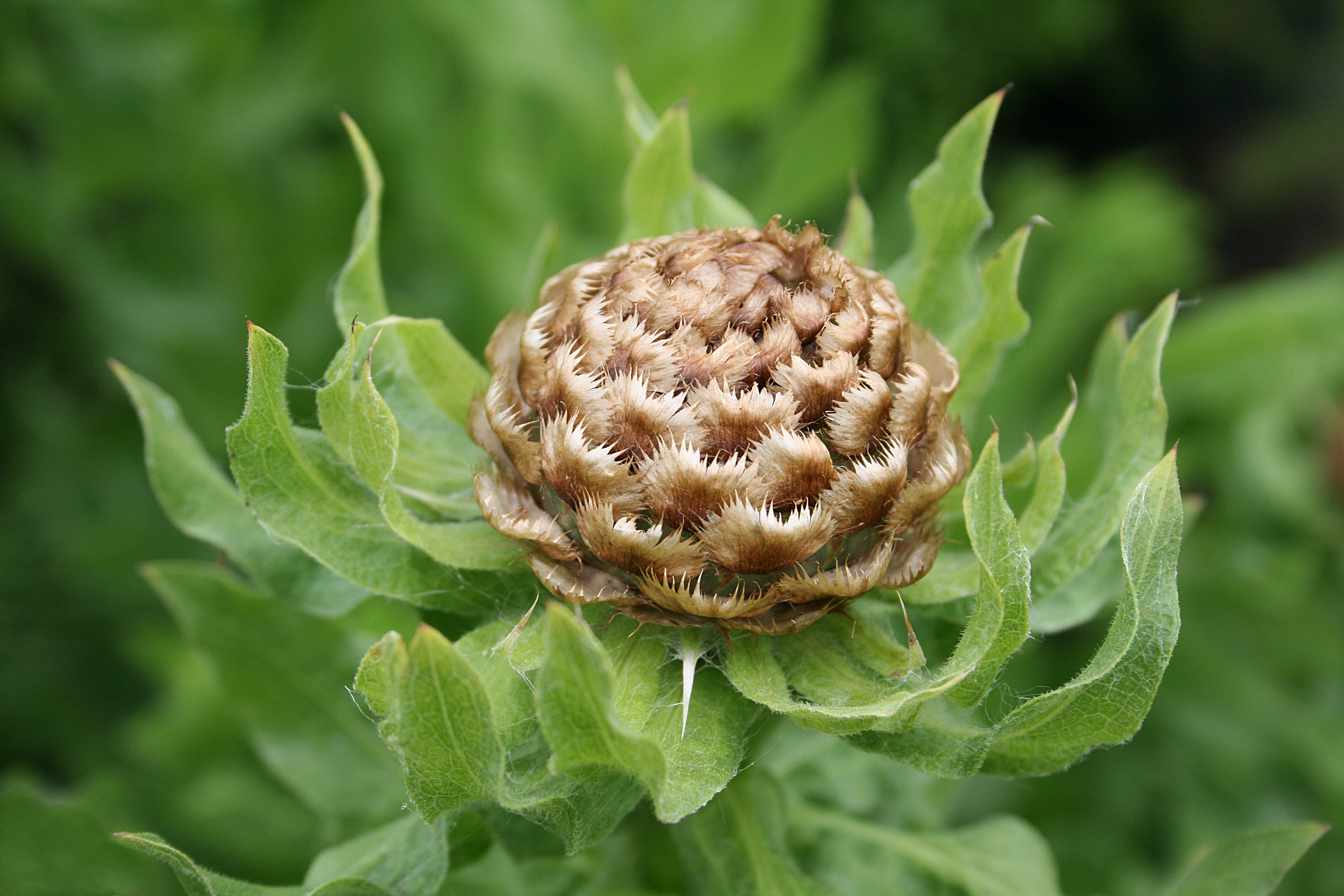
Bud

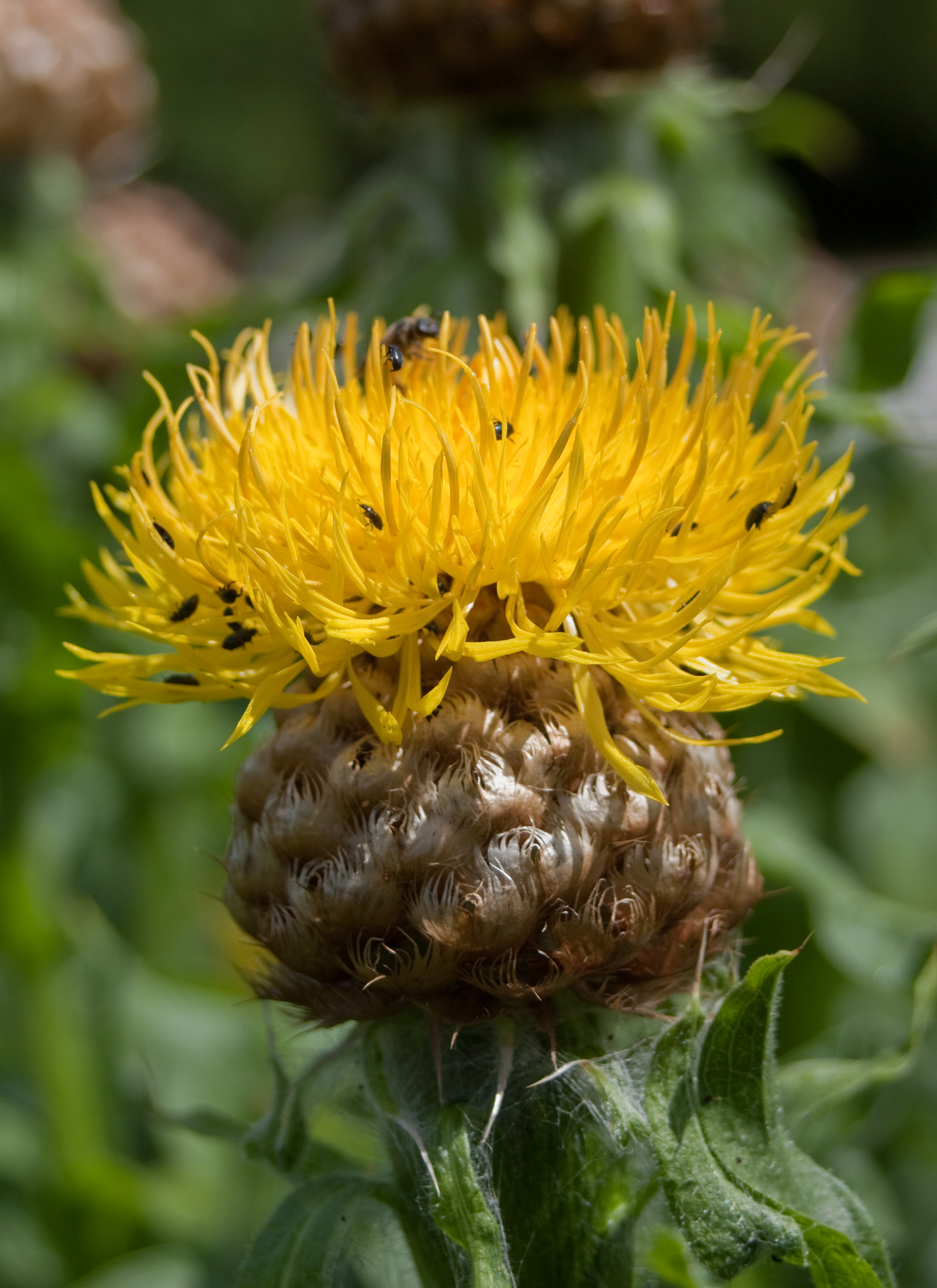
Head

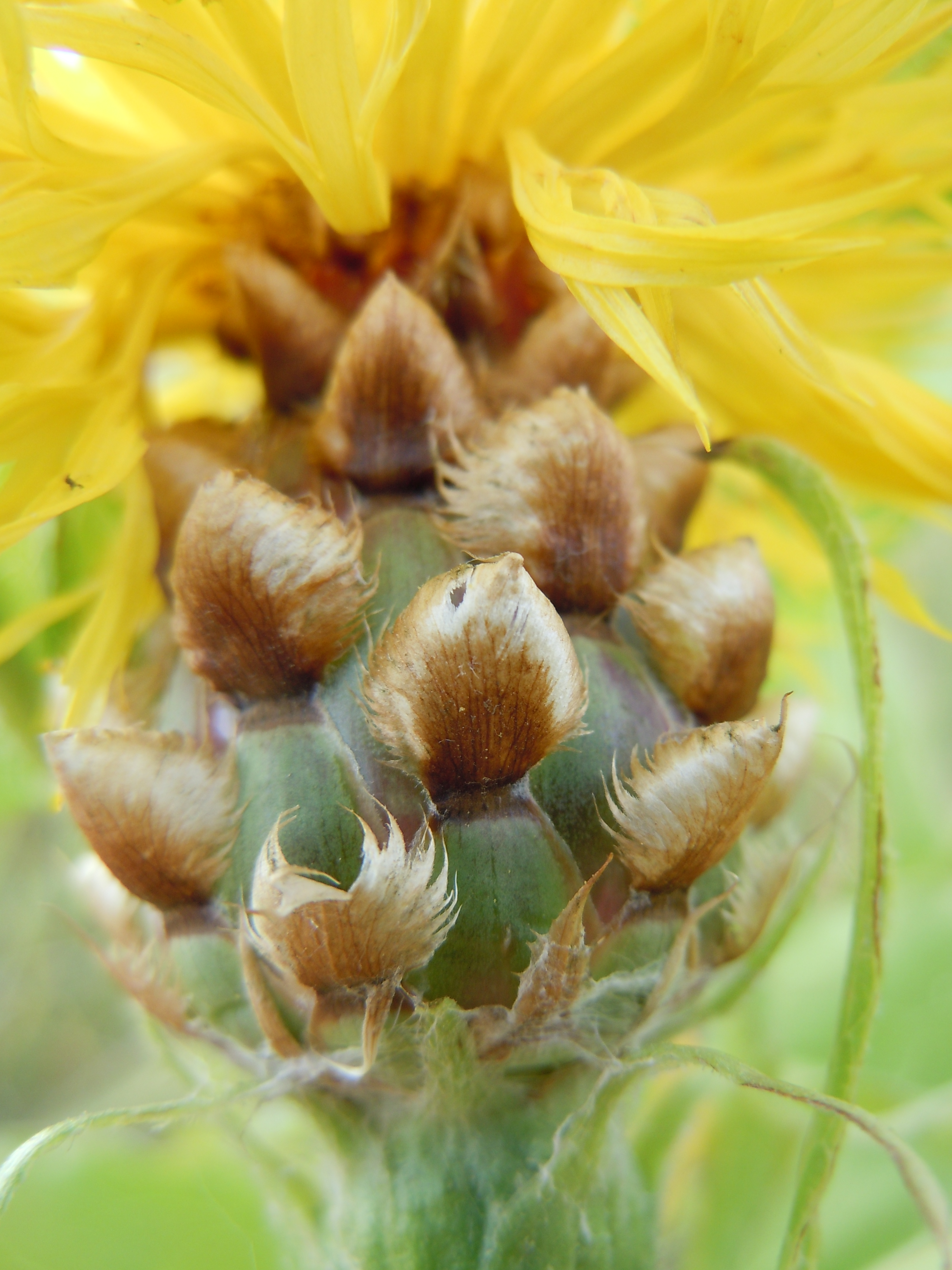
Fringed brown phyllaries

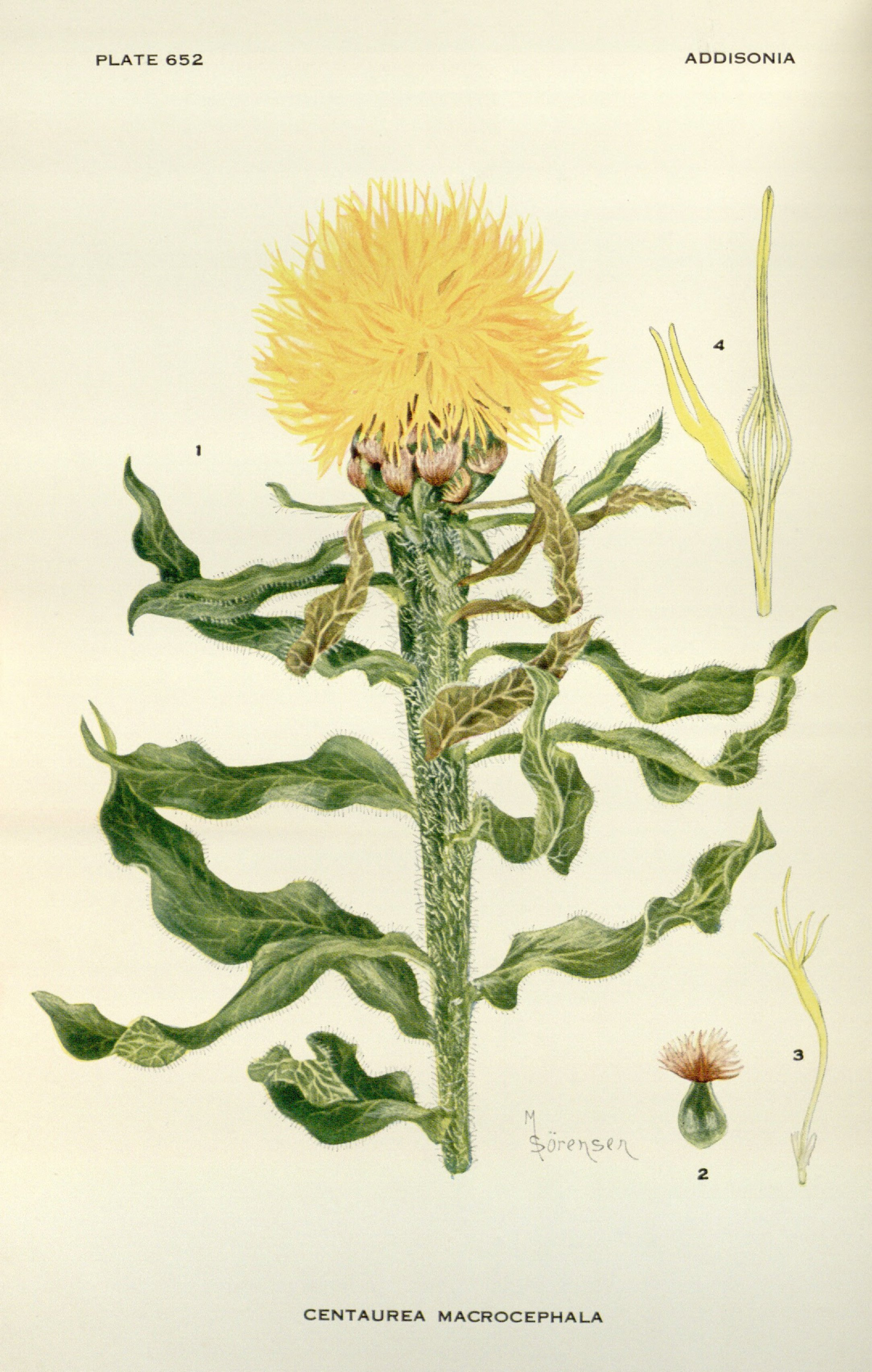
Illustration
