= Euphaedra maxima =

Scientific classification
- Kingdom: Animalia
- Phylum: Arthropoda
- Clade: Pancrustacea
- Class: Insecta
- Order: Lepidoptera
- Family: Nymphalidae
- Genus: Euphaedra
- Species: E. maxima

Binomial name
- Euphaedra maxima Holland, 1920

Synonyms
- Euphaedra xypete var. maxima Holland, 1920; Euphaedra (Xypetana) maxima; Euphaedra xypete var. flava Dufrane, 1933

Species of butterfly

Euphaedra maxima is a butterfly in the family Nymphalidae. It is found in Cameroon and the Democratic Republic of the Congo (Uele).

== Original description ==
Euphedra xypete maxima, new variety

There are three males and three females, which are referable to Romalaeosoma xypete Hewitson (cf. Exot. Butt., 1865, III, Romalaeosoma, Pl. 15, figs. 8-10), but which differ from specimens in my collection received from Sierra Leone, Cameroon, and Gaboon, in being much larger in size, by the prevalently bluish (not greenish) cast of the lighter portions of their wings on the upper side, and by having the spots which define the inner margin of the postapical band on the under side of the primaries much narrower and less strongly developed than is the case in specimens from the localities named. The form may be designated as var. maxima, the specimens averaging fully fifteen per cent more in expanse of wing than specimens taken on the west coast, of which I have many scores before me as I write. Male type, Medje; female allotype, Ngayu; paratypes, male, female, Ngayu. Images BOLD
