= Crystallospora =

Scientific classification
- Domain: Eukaryota
- Clade: Diaphoretickes
- Clade: SAR
- Clade: Alveolata
- Phylum: Apicomplexa
- Class: Conoidasida
- Order: Eucoccidiorida
- Family: Barrouxiidae
- Genus: Crystallospora; Labbé, 1896
- Species: C. cristalloides

Binomial name
- Crystallospora cristalloides (Thélohan, 1893) Dyková & Lom, 1981

Genus of single-celled organisms

Crystallospora is a genus of Apicomplexa in the family Aggregatidae.

== History ==
The genus Crystallospora was created by Labbé in 1896 for a coccidium that Thelohan had discovered in the Atlantic Ocean off France in 1893. The organism was originally called Coccidium cristalloides but Labbe renamed it Crystallospora thelohani.

This species was later transferred to Eimeria by Doflein in 1909.

In 1948 Dogel found the same species in Peter the Great Gulf (Pacific Ocean) off Japan.

Dyková and Lom in 1981 revived this genus because of its unique sporocyst structure.

== Taxonomy ==
There is one species in this genus.

== Description ==
The sporocysts have four sporocysts each with two sporozoites. They are dodecahedral in shape and are composed of two hexagonal, pyramidal valves joined at their bases by a suture.
