= Lasalocid =

Chemical compound

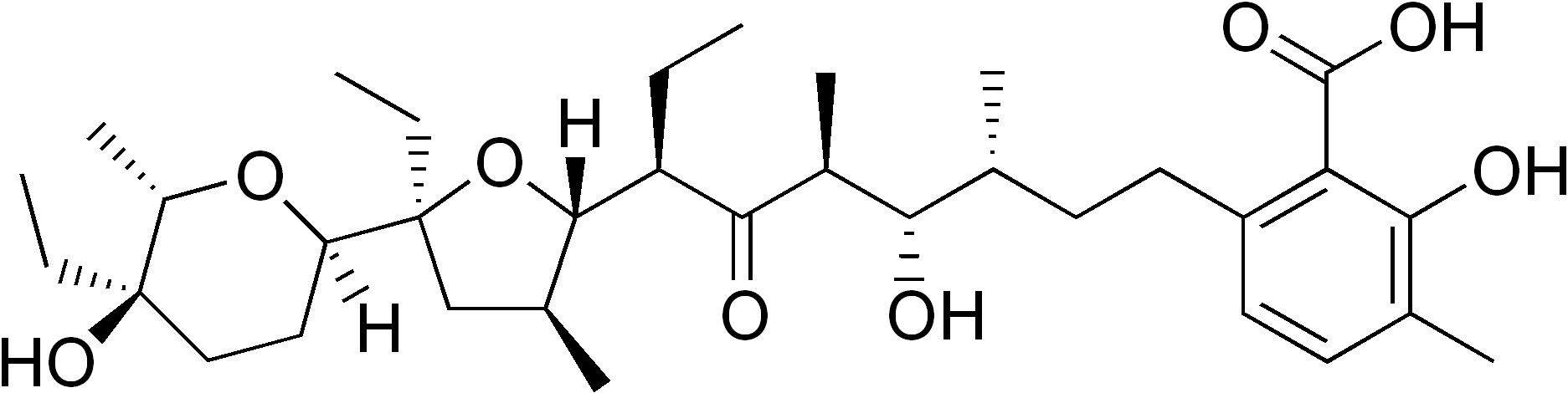

Clinical data
- AHFS/Drugs.com: International Drug Names
- ATCvet code: QP51BB02 (WHO)

Identifiers
- IUPAC name: 6-[(3R,4S,5S,7R)-7-[(2S,3S,5S)-5-ethyl-5-[(2R,5R,6S)-
- CAS Number: 25999-31-9
- PubChem CID: 5360807
- ChemSpider: 4514598
- UNII: W7V2ZZ2FWB
- KEGG: D04671
- ChEBI: CHEBI:92181
- ChEMBL: ChEMBL145347
- CompTox Dashboard (EPA): DTXSID9048485
- ECHA InfoCard: 100.043.077

Chemical and physical data
- Formula: C_{34}H_{54}O_{8}
- Molar mass: 590.798 g·mol^{−1}
- 3D model (JSmol): Interactive image
- SMILES: O=C(O)c1c(O)c(ccc1CC[C@@H](C)[C@H](O)[C@@H](C(=O)[C@@H]([C@H]3O[C@@]([C@@H]2O[C@H]([C@](O)(CC2)CC)C)(CC)C[C@@H]3C)CC)C)C
- InChI: InChI=1S/C34H54O8/c1-9-25(31-21(6)18-34(11-3,42-31)26-16-17-33(40,10-2)23(8)41-26)30(37)22(7)28(35)19(4)12-14-24-15-13-20(5)29(36)27(24)32(38)39/h13,15,19,21-23,25-26,28,31,35-36,40H,9-12,14,16-18H2,1-8H3,(H,38,39)/t19-,21+,22+,23+,25+,26-,28+,31+,33-,34+/m1/s1; Key:BBMULGJBVDDDNI-OWKLGTHSSA-N

Lasalocid is an antibacterial agent and a coccidiostat, which is produced by strains of Streptomyces lasaliensis. It is the drug in the feed additives called Bovatec and Avatec.

Lasalocid is able to make neutral complexes with monovalent and divalent cations and transport them through apolar phase (including lipid bilayer membranes). It can also transport big organic cations like dopamine.

Horses and dogs are very susceptible to the toxic effects of lasalocid, and it should never be administered to non-target species.
