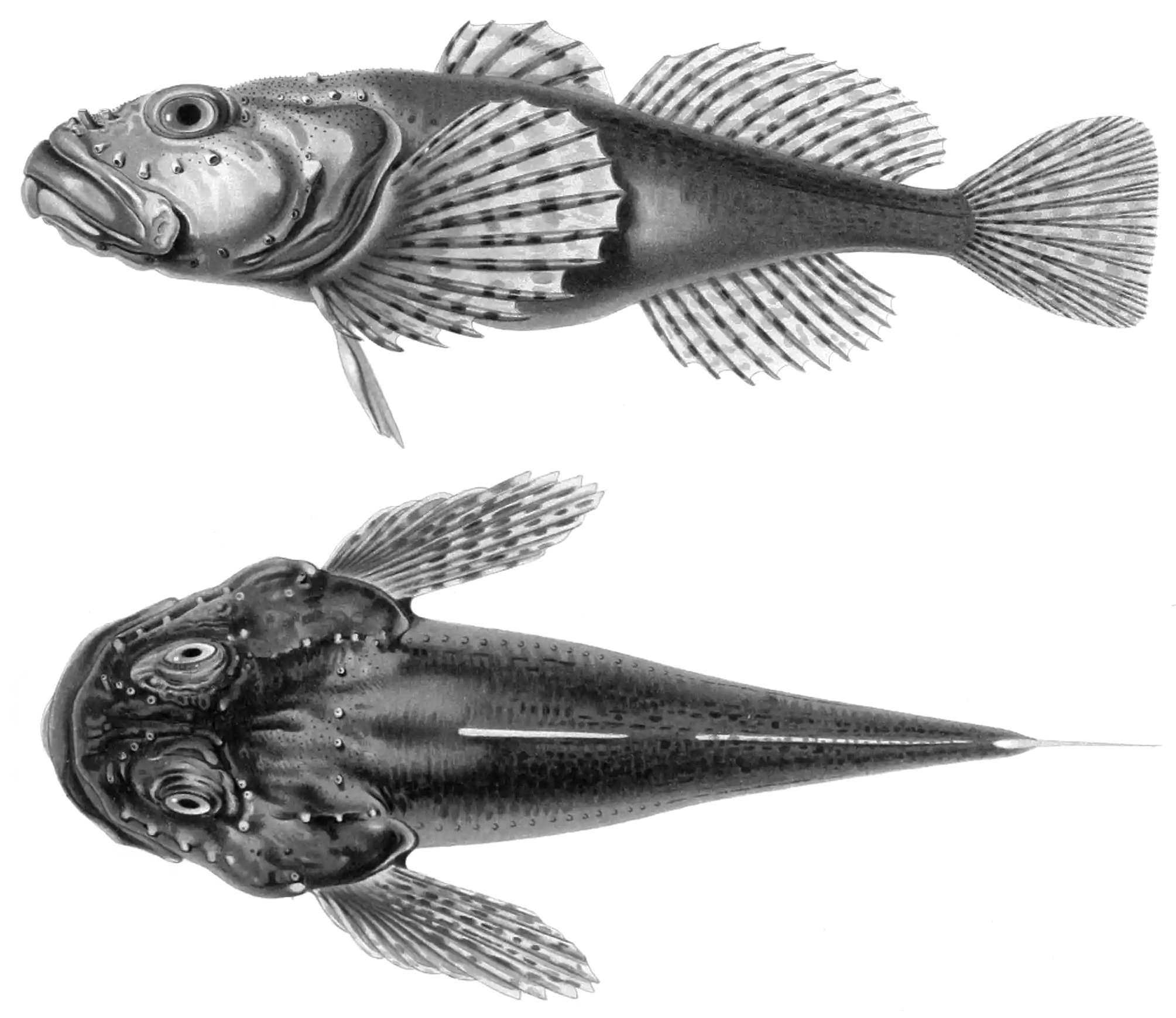

Scientific classification
- Kingdom: Animalia
- Phylum: Chordata
- Class: Actinopterygii
- Order: Perciformes
- Suborder: Cottoidei
- Family: Cottidae
- Genus: Batrachocottus
- Species: B. baicalensis

Binomial name
- Batrachocottus baicalensis Dybowski, 1874

Synonyms
- Cottus baicalensis Dybowski, 1874

= Bighead sculpin =

Species of fish

The bighead sculpin (Batrachocottus baicalensis) is a species of sculpin fish that is endemic to the Lake Baikal watershed in Siberia, Russia. It typically lives on rocky bottoms, often in places with sponges, at depths of 5 to 70 m (16–230 ft), but can occur as deep as 120 m (390 ft). Its colour varies from grayish to brownish or greenish depending on the bottom type. It can reach up to 22 cm (8.7 in) in length, but most are 13–16 cm (5.1–6.3 in). It feeds on a wide range of smaller animals such as young fish, insect larvae, amphipods, molluscs and oligochaetes. Breeding is in the spring where the female lays 618 to 1622 eggs, which are guarded by the male.

The bighead sculpin is variously considered to belong either to the family Cottocomephoridae, Cottidae or Abyssocottidae.
