= Eimeria couesii =

Scientific classification
- Domain: Eukaryota
- Clade: Sar
- Clade: Alveolata
- Phylum: Apicomplexa
- Class: Conoidasida
- Order: Eucoccidiorida
- Family: Eimeriidae
- Genus: Eimeria
- Species: E. couesii

Binomial name
- Eimeria couesii Kruidenier, Levine, and Ivens, 1960

Species of single-celled organism

Eimeria couesii is an apicomplexan parasite of the genus Eimeria that infects the intestine of the rice rat Oryzomys couesi in Mexico. It has an oocyst residuum and Stieda bodies, structures that are absent in some other Eimeria.

== Literature cited ==
- Barnard, W.P., Ernst, J.V. and Stevens, R.O. 1971. Eimeria palustris sp. n. and Isospora hammondi sp. n. (Coccidia: Eimeriidae) from the marsh rice rat, Oryzomys palustris (Harlan) (subscription required). The Journal of Parasitology 57(6):1293–1296.
- Barnard, W.P., Ernst, J.V. and Dixon, C.F. 1974. Coccidia of the cotton rat, Sigmodon hispidus, from Alabama (subscription required). The Journal of Parasitology 60(3):406–414.
- Kruidenier, F.J., Levine, N.D. and Ivens, V. 1960. Eimeria (Protozoa: Eimeriidae) from the rice rat and pygmy mouse in Mexico. Transactions of the Illinois Academy of Sciences 52:100–101.
