= Eimeria zuernii =

Scientific classification
- Domain: Eukaryota
- Clade: Sar
- Clade: Alveolata
- Phylum: Apicomplexa
- Class: Conoidasida
- Order: Eucoccidiorida
- Family: Eimeriidae
- Genus: Eimeria
- Species: E. zuernii

Binomial name
- Eimeria zuernii (Rivolta, 1878)

Species of single-celled organism

Eimeria zuernii is a species of the parasite Eimeria that causes diarrheic disease known as eimeriosis in cattle (Bos taurus), and mainly affects younger animals. The disease is also commonly referred to as coccidiosis. The parasite can be found in cattle around the globe.

== Description ==
Eimeria zuernii is a very host specific parasite that only infects cattle. Cattle gets infected by ingesting food, water or surfaces contaminated with infective (sporulated) oocysts (fecal-oral-route). After the oocyst hatch in the gut of the animal it releases 8 zoites that undergo two asexual cycles (schizogony). The first cycle happens inside the lamina propria cells and produces many small schizonts. The second generation of schizonts target epithelial cells in the cecum and colon. The second generation of schizonts undergo a sexual cycle (gametogony) which is also the time when clinical signs of the disease can be observed. The release of new oocysts destroys mucosal cells which can lead to loss of serum and blood. This can be observed as bloody diarrhea. The time from ingestion of the parasite to the first signs of disease (prepatent period) is 12–14 days. Oocysts can be observed in a microscope as a colourless, single-layered wall with no micropyle with a size of 15–22 μm x 13–18 μm and having a subspherical, subovoid or elliptic shape.

== Diagnosis ==
The infection status of an animal is evaluated by examining the oocysts using different flotation methods, usually by counting the oocysts under a light microscope and identifying the species of the Eimeria based on morphology. When evaluating if the animal is having eimeriosis, due to infection with E. zuernii (eimeriosis) or other pathogenic Eimeria species, four things are taken into account: age of the animal, presence of a pathogenic Eimeria species, infection intensity (oocysts per gram faeces), and presence of symptoms (diarrhea, blood in the faeces).

== Epidemiology ==
Environmental factors can influence how fast new oocysts become infective and management of the animals living conditions and feed and how easily the animals get infected. In general, pathogenic Eimeria species, including E. zuernii, can cause three types of disease in a herd that often manifest as outbreaks. Winter coccidiosis or eimeriosis – animals becoming more susceptibile to infections due to cold and crowding of the animals facilitate the spread (housing of cattle at the end of a pasture season). Summer coccidiosis or eimeriosis – susceptible animals ingesting overwintering oocysts on pastures on turn-out and increased sporulation of new oocysts due to increasing temperatures.

== Immunology ==
Following the initial infection with an Eimeria species the animal usually is protected by immunity to that species, and is less likely to develop disease. The level of immunity depend on the amount of oocysts that infected the animal. Heavy infections with Eimeria zuernii in calves can produce more of the acute phase proteins haptoglobin and serum amyloid A and reduce weight gain, when symptoms of coccidiosis can be observed (patent period).

== Response to environmental factors ==
The majority of the parasites life is in the environment and both survival of the parasite as well as developing into an infective oocysts depends on these factors. The time from when the parasite has left the animal in the faeces inside an oocyst and has developed in to a parasite that can infect new animals, is called the sporulation time. High humidity and temperature can speed up the sporulation time and facilitate new infections faster, which can lead to regular outbreaks of coccidiosis. Unsporulated Eimeria zuernii oocysts can handle −18 degrees Celsius for a month and still be able to sporulate.
