= Amprolium =

Names
- Preferred IUPAC name 1-[(4-Amino-2-propylpyrimidin-5-yl)methyl]-2-methylpyridin-1-ium chloride
- Other names 1-[(4-Amino-2-propyl-5-pyrimidinyl)methyl]-2-picolinium chloride, Amprovine, Amprolium, Amprol, Anticoccid

Identifiers
CAS Number	121-25-5
3D model (JSmol)	Interactive image
ChEBI	CHEBI:85265
ChEMBL	ChEMBL97350
ChemSpider	66070
ECHA InfoCard	100.004.054
EC Number	204-458-4
MeSH	Amprolium
PubChem CID	2178
UNII	71M75T660B
CompTox Dashboard (EPA)	DTXSID10904505
- InChI: InChI=1S/C14H19N4.ClH/c1-3-6-13-16-9-12(14(15)17-13)10-18-8-5-4-7-11(18)2;/h4-5,7-9H,3,6,10H2,1-2H3,(H2,15,16,17);1H/q+1;/p-1 Key: LCTXBFGHZLGBNU-UHFFFAOYSA-M; InChI=1/C14H19N4.ClH/c1-3-6-13-16-9-12(14(15)17-13)10-18-8-5-4-7-11(18)2;/h4-5,7-9H,3,6,10H2,1-2H3,(H2,15,16,17);1H/q+1;/p-1 Key: LCTXBFGHZLGBNU-REWHXWOFAP
- SMILES: [Cl-].n1c(c(cnc1CCC)C[n+]2ccccc2C)N

Properties
Chemical formula	C_{14}H_{19}N_{4}^{+} · Cl^{−}
Molar mass	278.780 g·mol^{−1}

Pharmacology
ATCvet code	QP51BX02 (WHO) QP51BX52 (WHO)
Legal status	CA: ℞-only
- Except where otherwise noted, data are given for materials in their standard state (at 25 °C [77 °F], 100 kPa). verify (what is ?) Infobox references

Amprolium is the organic compound sold as a coccidiostat used in poultry. It has many International Nonproprietary Names.

== Uses in coccidiosis treatment in poultry ==
The drug is a thiamine analogue and blocks the thiamine transporter of Eimeria species. By blocking thiamine uptake it prevents carbohydrate synthesis.

Despite only moderate efficacy it is well favoured due to few resistance issues and is commonly used in the United States in conjunction with sulfonamides prophylactically in chickens and cattle as a coccidiostat.

== Synthesis ==
Amprolium synthesis Rogers, Sarett, U.S. patent 3,020,277 (1962 to Merck & Co.), see also U.S. patent 3,020,200

Condensation of ethoxymethylenemalononitrile (1) with acetamidine (2) affords the substituted pyrimidine (4). The reaction may well involve conjugate addition of the amidine nitrogen to the malononitrile followed by loss of ethoxide (3); addition of the remaining amidine nitrogen to one of the nitriles will then lead to the pyrimidine (4). Reduction of the nitrile gives the corresponding aminomethyl compound (5). Exhaustive methylation of the amine followed by displacement of the activated quaternary nitrogen by bromide ion affords the key intermediate (7). Displacement of the halogen by α-picoline gives amprolium.
