= Coccidiosis =

Parasitic disease of animals

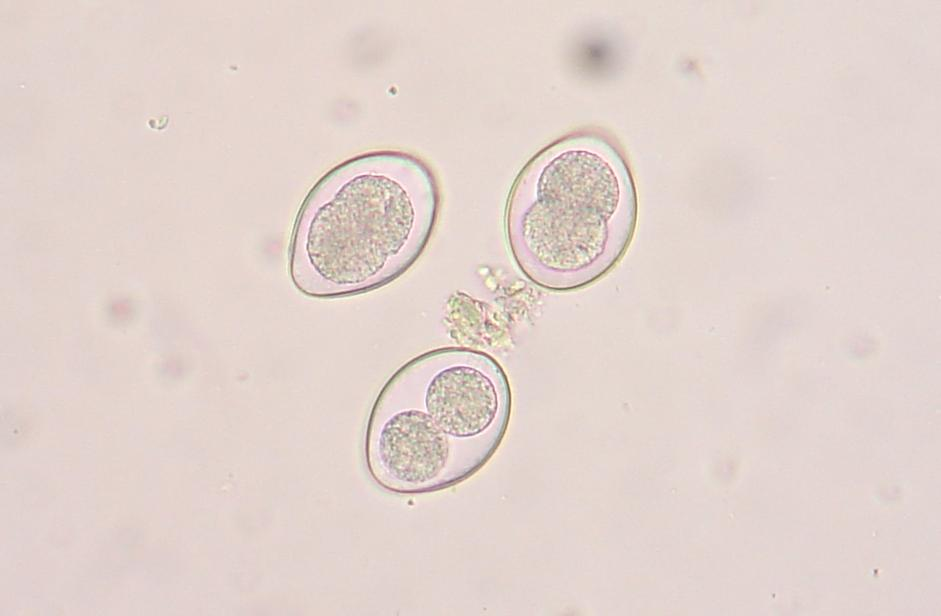
Coccidia oocysts in a fecal flotation from a cat. The cat was underweight and had diarrhea, showing signs of coccidiosis

Coccidiosis is a parasitic disease of the intestinal tract of animals caused by coccidian protozoa. The disease spreads from one animal to another by contact with infected feces or ingestion of infected tissue. Diarrhea, which may become bloody in severe cases, is the primary symptom. Most animals infected with coccidia are asymptomatic, but young or immunocompromised animals may suffer severe symptoms and death.

While coccidia can infect a wide variety of animals, including humans, birds, and livestock, they are usually species-specific. One well-known exception is toxoplasmosis caused by Toxoplasma gondii.

Humans may first encounter coccidia when they acquire a dog, cat or bird that is infected. Other than T. gondii, the infectious organisms are canine and feline-specific and are not contagious to humans, unlike the zoonotic diseases.

== Coccidia in dogs ==
Puppies are frequently infected with coccidia from the feces of their mother, and are more likely to develop coccidiosis due to their undeveloped immune systems. Stress can trigger symptoms in susceptible animals.

Symptoms in young dogs include diarrhea with mucus and blood, poor appetite, vomiting, and dehydration. Untreated, the disease can be fatal.

Treatment is routine and effective. Diagnosis is made by low-powered microscopic examination of the feces, which is generally replete with oocysts. Readily available drugs eliminate the protozoa or reduce them enough that the animal's immune system can clear the infection. Permanent damage to the gastrointestinal system is rare, and a dog will usually suffer no long-lasting negative effects.

== Coccidia in chickens ==
Coccidiosis is a significant disease for chickens, especially affecting the young chicks. It can be fatal or leave the bird with compromised digestion. There are chick feed mixes that contain a coccidiostat to manage exposure levels and control disease. In an outbreak, coccidiocidal medications are given. Examples are toltrazuril (Baycox) or amprolium. After multiple infections, surviving chickens become resistant to the coccidia.

== Coccidia in cattle ==
Coccidiosis (in cattle also known as Eimeriosis) is one of the most important diseases in calves and youngstock both under housing conditions and when grazing. Symptoms are generally caused by the species Eimeria zuernii and Eimeria bovis and include loss of appetite, fatigue, dehydration, and watery, sometimes bloody, diarrhoea. Outbreaks are known to occur in cattle herds. The parasite can infect all animals on the farm and in some countries the parasite is present on all farms. Coccidiosis affects the growth and sometimes survival of the calves and consequently affect the production and the profitability of cattle livestock production.

== Coccidia in goats ==
Coccidiosis is also present in goats, and is the largest cause of diarrhea in young goats. It can also cause high temperature and loss of appetite.

== Genera and species that cause coccidiosis ==
- Genus Isospora is the most common cause of intestinal coccidiosis in dogs and cats. Species of Isospora are host-specific, infecting only one species. Species that infect dogs include I. canis, I. ohioensis, I. burrowsi, and I. neorivolta. Species that infect cats include I. felis and I. rivolta. The most common symptom is diarrhea. Sulfonamides are the most common treatment.
- Genus Eimeria affects birds such as poultry and mammals such as cattle and rabbits. Species include E. tenella, E. brunetti, E. necatrix, and E. acervulina. Sulfonamides are effective.
- Genus Cryptosporidium contains two species known to cause cryptosporidiosis, C. parvum and C. muris. Cattle are most commonly affected, and their feces may be a source of infection for other mammals, including humans. Recent genetic analyses of Cryptosporidium in humans have identified C. hominis as a human-specific pathogen. Infection occurs most commonly in immunocompromised individuals, such as dogs with canine distemper, cats with feline leukemia, and humans with AIDS.
- Genus Hammondia is transmitted by ingestion of cysts found in the tissue of grazing animals and rodents. Dogs and cats are the definitive hosts, with H. heydorni infecting dogs and the H. hammondi and H. pardalis infecting cats. Symptoms do not usually occur.
- Genus Besnoitia infects cats that ingest cysts in the tissue of rodents and opossums, but usually do not cause disease.
- Genus Sarcocystis infects carnivores that ingest cysts from various intermediate hosts. Sarcocystis may cause disease in dogs and cats.
- Genus Toxoplasma has one important species, T. gondii. Cats are the definitive host, but all mammals and some fish, reptiles, and amphibians can be intermediate hosts. Only cat feces will hold infective oocysts, but infection through ingestion of cysts can occur with the tissue of any intermediate host. Toxoplasmosis occurs in humans usually as low-grade fever or muscle pain for a few days. A normal immune system will suppress the infection but the tissue cysts will persist in that animal or human for years or for life. In immunocompromised individuals, dormant cysts can be reactivated and cause lesions in the brain, heart, lungs, eyes, and other tissues. A fetus may be at risk if a pregnant woman without immunity becomes infected. Symptoms in cats include fever, weight loss, diarrhea, vomiting, uveitis, and central nervous system signs. Disease in dogs includes paralysis, tremors, and seizures. Dogs and cats are usually treated with clindamycin.
- Genus Neospora has one important species, N. caninum, which affects dogs in a manner similar to toxoplasmosis. Neosporosis is difficult to treat.
- Genus Hepatozoon contains one species that causes hepatozoonosis in dogs and cats, H. canis. Animals become infected by ingesting an infected brown dog tick (Rhipicephalus sanguineus). Symptoms include fever, weight loss, and pain in the spine and limbs.

The most common medications used to treat coccidian infections are in the sulfonamide antibiotic family.

Depending on the pathogen and the condition of the animal, untreated coccidiosis may clear of its own accord, or become severe and damaging, and sometimes cause death.
