= Choleoeimeria =

Scientific classification
- Domain: Eukaryota
- (unranked): SAR
- (unranked): Alveolata
- Phylum: Apicomplexa
- Class: Conoidasida
- Order: Eucoccidiorida
- Family: Eimeriidae
- Genus: Choleoeimeria Paperna and Landsberg 1989

Species
- Choleoeimeria ahtanumensis Choleoeimeria allogamae Choleoeimeria allogehyrae Choleoeimeria amphisbaenae Choleoeimeria auratae Choleoeimeria baltrocki Choleoeimeria bitis Choleoeimeria bohemii Choleoeimeria boulii Choleoeimeria brookesiae Choleoeimeria calotesi Choleoeimeria carinii Choleoeimeria cascabeli Choleoeimeria chalcides Choleoeimeria egerniae Choleoeimeria fasciatus Choleoeimeria flaviviridis Choleoeimeria glawi Choleoeimeria hemprichii Choleoeimeria heteronotis Choleoeimeria hirbayah Choleoeimeria largeni Choleoeimeria lygosomis Choleoeimeria noctisauris Choleoeimeria pachydactyli Choleoeimeria pellopleuris Choleoeimeria persica Choleoeimeria riyadhae Choleoeimeria rochalimai Choleoeimeria scincellae Choleoeimeria scinci Choleoeimeria sylvatica Choleoeimeria sadlieri Choleoeimeria tilburyi Choleoeimeria turcicus Choleoeimeria saqanqouri Choleoeimeria sylvatica Choleoeimeria umis Choleoeimeria urosauris Choleoeimeria xiangmaii

Genus of single-celled organisms

Choleoeimeria is a genus of alveolate parasites that infect the biliary tracts of reptiles. Morphologically they are similar to the Eimeria, to whom they are closely related. The genus was described in 1989 by Paperna and Landsberg.

== General features ==
The endogenous development of the parasite occurs in the cells of the bile epithelium.

The infected host cell becomes hypertrophic and emerges above the epithelial surface. This hypertrophy coincides with a drastic depletion of the microvilli. The junction zone along with the underlying cell extends into numerous long and fine membranal out-folds.

Meront: These undergo binary fission.

Microgamont: The differentiating microgamont develops an expanded multilobed body.

Macrogamont: The organelles include type 1 and type 2 wall forming bodies, canaliculi and granular bodies.

Oocyte: The oocyst wall forms from 4 wall-membranes consolidating over the zygote plasmalemma. The oocysts possess four sporocysts each containing two sporozoites.

These species possess bivalved sporocysts and lack a Stieda body.

== Host-parasite relations ==
- Choleoeimeria allogamae - Agama species
- Choleoeimeria allogehyrae - Top-end dtella (Gehyra australis)
- Choleoeimeria amphisbaenae - red worm lizard (Amphisbaena alba)
- Choleoeimeria baltrocki - gold skink (Eumeces schneiderii)
- Choleoeimeria boulii - variegated dtella (Gehyra variegata)
- Choleoeimeria calotesi - blue crested lizard (Calotes mystaceus)
- Choleoeimeria carinii - teiid lizard (Ameiva ameiva)
- Choleoeimeria heteronotis - Binoe's prickly gecko (Heteronotia binoei)
- Choleoeimeria hirbayah - veiled chameleon (Chamaeleo calyptratus)
- Choleoeimeria lygosomis - Lygosoma buringi
- Choleoeimeria pachydactyli - Cape thick-toed gecko (Pachydactylus capensis)
- Choleoeimeria riyadhae - sandfish (Scincus scincus)
- Choleoeimeria rochalimai - tropical house gecko (Hemidactylus mabouia)
- Choleoeimeria sadlieri - marble-throated skink (Marmorosphax tricolor)
- Choleoeimeria sylvatica - blue throated rainbow skink (Carlia rhomboidalis)
- Choleoeimeria xiangmaii - common house gecko (Hemidactylus frenatus)
