= Acroeimeria =

Scientific classification
- Domain: Eukaryota
- Clade: Sar
- Clade: Alveolata
- Phylum: Apicomplexa
- Class: Conoidasida
- Order: Eucoccidiorida
- Family: Eimeriidae
- Genus: Acroeimeria; Paperna and Landsberg 1989

Species
- Acroeimeria cnemidophori Acroeimeria lineri Acroeimeria paraensis Acroeimeria pintoi Acroeimeria rouxi Acroeimeria sceloporis

Genus of single-celled organisms

Acroeimeria is a genus of parasites that contains those species which initially develop immediately beneath the brush-border of the intestinal epithelium, but the meronts and gamonts of which are early on extruded to form a layer on the surface of the gut mucosa. Morphologically they are similar to the Eimeria to which they are closely related. The genus was described in 1989 by Paperna and Landsberg.

== General features ==
The defining feature of this genus is their development, after becoming enclosed by extensions of the host cell membrane, within the resulting parasitophorous 'sack' which bulges out above the surface of the intestinal mucosa. This pattern of development is not known to occur in birds or mammals but is common in fish.

The endogenous development of the parasite is intra-cytoplasmic, within the epithelial cells of the ileum. The parasites lie above (closer to the lumen) the host cell nucleus. Below the parasitophorous vacuole, the host cytoplasm expands as the volume of the parasite increases, giving rise to a short, stalk-like structure.

The merozoite enters a gap formed in the host cell's brush border and then becomes enclosed by extensions of the host cell wall. A second, interior membrane is formed beneath the wall of the parasitophorous vacuole and this membrane is either confined to the proximal part of the parasitophorous vacuole or is ruptured distally. This membrane is retained throughout the growth and differentiation of the parasite.

Meront: These possess all the typical features of the Apicomplexia including an apical complex, sub-pellicular tubules and micronemes. Young meronts are bound by a single membrane, and contain large mitochondria and a few micronemes.

Microgamont:

Macrogamont: Young macrogamonts possess a large, vesicular nucleus with a conspicuous central nucleolus. The cytoplasm contains a bilobed medium-density granular inclusion. The cytoplasm is densely packed with ribosomes and has a dense endoplasmic reticulum. The nucleus of The parasite is fringed by numerous adnuclear bodies. In the late stages of maturation, the cytoplasm becomes filled with amylopectin granules. The macrogamonts are bound by a single unit membrane, coated by a variable amount of glycocalyx.

Oocyte: The oocysts possess four sporocysts each containing two sporozoites. Like most of the Eimeria species infecting reptiles the sporocysts of these species lack both Stieda bodies and substieda bodies.

== Host-parasite relations ==
- Acroeimeria cnemidophori — teiid lizard (Cnemidophorus lemniscatus lemniscatus)
- Acroeimeria paraensis — teiid lizard (Cnemidophorus lemniscatus lemniscatus)
- Acroeimeria pintoi — teiid lizard (Ameiva ameiva)
- Acroeimeria rouxi — marble-throated skink (Marmorosphax tricolor)
