= Hoarella =

Scientific classification
- Domain: Eukaryota
- Clade: Sar
- Superphylum: Alveolata
- Phylum: Apicomplexa
- Class: Conoidasida
- Order: Eucoccidiorida
- Family: Eimeriidae
- Genus: Hoarella; Arcay de Peraza, 1963
- Species: H. garnhami

Binomial name
- Hoarella garnhami Arcay de Peraza, 1963

Genus of single-celled organisms

Hoarella is a genus of parasitic alveolates in the phylum Apicomplexa. This genus infects reptiles.

Only one species (Hoarella garnhami) in this genus is recognised.

== Description ==
This genus was described in 1963 by Arcay de Peraza.

The meronts and gamonts are found within the intestinal wall.

The oocysts have 16 sporocysts each of which has 2 sporozoites.

The life cycle is currently not known.

== Host range ==
This species is found in the rainbow whiptail lizard (Cnemidophorus lemniscatus).
