= Epieimeria =

Scientific classification
- Domain: Eukaryota
- Clade: Sar
- Superphylum: Alveolata
- Phylum: Apicomplexa
- Class: Conoidasida
- Order: Eucoccidiorida
- Family: Eimeriidae
- Genus: Epieimeria; Dyková & Lom 1981

Species
- Epieimeria anguillae Epieimeria isabellae Epieimeria ocellata

Genus of single-celled organisms

Epieimeria is a genus of parasitic alveolates of the phylum Apicomplexa.

The genus was created in 1981 by Dyková and Lom. Species in this genus were earlier classified as Eimeria.

== Taxonomy ==
Species in this genus infect fish.

== Description ==
Like other eimerians, the species in this genus undergo intracellular merogony and gametogony. Trophozoites and both the merogonic and gametogonic stages develop in a parasitophorous vacuole which lies half embedded in the epithelial cell and protrudes into the intestinal lumen. The parasitophorous vacuole itself is surrounded by a single membrane but towards the intestinal lumen it is also covered by the cell membrane.

Sporogony takes place outside the fish or intercellularly.

The wall of the sporocyst opens at its apex through a round pore.

Oocysts as well as being excreted may infiltrate into the mucosa and thence into the viscera and internal cavities where they may accumulate there and sporulate within the host. These will be liberated only after the death of the host.

A Stieda body is present.
