= Alveocystis =

Scientific classification
- Domain: Eukaryota
- Clade: Sar
- Clade: Alveolata
- Phylum: Apicomplexa
- Class: Conoidasida
- Order: Eucoccidiorida
- Family: Eimeriidae
- Genus: Alveocystis; Bel'tenev, 1980

Species
- Alveocystis cleopatri Alveocystis gugleri Alveocystis intestinalis Alveocystis macrocoronata

Genus of single-celled organisms

Alveocystis is a genus in the phylum Apicomplexa. Species in this genus infect worms of the family Priapuloidea and molluscs. This genus has been poorly studied and little is known about it.

== History ==
This genus was created by Bel'tenev in 1980.

The recognised first species of this genus was Alveocystis macrocoronata by Lüling in 1942.

== Taxonomy ==
Four species are recognised in this genus. Morphologically they resemble members of the genus Pfeifferinella.

== Description ==
The oocysts have no sporocysts. A distinct convex micropyle is usually present at one end of the oocyst. Within each oocyst there are 8 or more free sporozoites and a large oocyst residuum.
