= Sivatoshella =

Scientific classification
- Domain: Eukaryota
- Clade: Sar
- Superphylum: Alveolata
- Phylum: Apicomplexa
- Class: Conoidasida
- Order: Eucoccidiorida
- Family: Eimeriidae
- Genus: Sivatoshella; Ray & Sarker, 1968
- Species: S. lonchurae

Binomial name
- Sivatoshella lonchurae Ray & Sarker, 1968

Genus of single-celled organisms

Sivatoshella is a genus of parasitic alveolates in the phylum Apicomplexa.

== History ==
This species and genus was described in 1968 by Ray and Sarak.

== Taxonomy ==
There is currently only one species recognised in this genus - Sivatoshella lonchurae.

== Life cycle ==
Little is known about this species and genus. Transmission is presumably by the orofaecal route.

This species is found in the duodenum and small intestine of both the Indian silverbill (Lonchura malabarica) and the scaly breasted munia (Lonchura punctulata).

The sporulation time has been estimated to be 24–48 hours at 31 degrees Celsius.

To date it has only been described in Calcutta, West Bengal in India.

== Description ==
The oocysts are spherical with diameter of 36–38 μm (mean 37.5). The wall is thick and 4 layered. The outermost layer is thin, transparent and colourless. The next layer inwards is slightly broader and light green in colour. Moving inwards again the 3rd layer is thinner and light yellow in colour. The innermost layer is a dark black colour. Neither a residuum or micropyle is present in the oocyst.

Sporocysts are 2 broad pear-shaped bodies with a Stieda body and a prominent substeidal body at the narrow pole. In length they are 28–29 μm and in width 18 μm. A sporocyst residuum present as minute refractile globules embedded in a dark matrix.

Sporozoites are broad, comma-shaped, with one large vacuole at the broad pole and nucleus at the center of the body. Sixteen sporozoites are present in each sporocyst and these are arranged at the periphery of the residual mass.
