= Plasmodium telfordi =

Scientific classification
- Domain: Eukaryota
- Clade: Sar
- Clade: Alveolata
- Phylum: Apicomplexa
- Class: Aconoidasida
- Order: Haemospororida
- Family: Plasmodiidae
- Genus: Plasmodium
- Species: P. telfordi

Binomial name
- Plasmodium telfordi (Lainson, Landau and Shaw 1971)

Species of single-celled organism

Plasmodium telfordi is a parasite of the genus Plasmodium.

Like all Plasmodium species P. telfordi has both vertebrate and insect hosts. The vertebrate hosts for this parasite are reptiles.

== Geographical occurrence ==
This species is found in Venezuela.

== Clinical features and host pathology ==
This species infects the lizard Ameiva ameiva.
