= Plasmodium cnemidophori =

Scientific classification
- Domain: Eukaryota
- Clade: Sar
- Clade: Alveolata
- Phylum: Apicomplexa
- Class: Aconoidasida
- Order: Haemospororida
- Family: Plasmodiidae
- Genus: Plasmodium
- Species: P. cnemidophori

Binomial name
- Plasmodium cnemidophori Carini, 1941

Species of single-celled organism

Plasmodium cnemidophori is a parasite of the genus Plasmodium subgenus Sauramoeba. As in all Plasmodium species, P. cnemidophori has both vertebrate and insect hosts. The vertebrate hosts for this parasite are lizards.

== Description ==
The parasite was first described by Carini in 1941.

The schizonts and gametocytes caused hypertrophy and distortion of host cell and nucleus. The nucleus may be displaced.

Pigment is not located in a distinct vacuole.

The schizonts are usually polar in position, rounded in shape, and may produce over 100 merozoites. Large schizonts visibly enlarge the erythrocyte. Mature schizonts measure 13.0 +/- 0.4 (range: 10-15) micrometres x 10.8 +/- 3 (range: 8-13) micrometres.

The gametocytes are elongated and lateral in position.

Mature microgametocytes measure 11.8 +/- 0.9 (range: 10-15) micrometres x 8.8 +/- 0.6 (range:7-10) micrometres.

== Distribution ==
This species is found in Brazil, Panama and Venezuela.

== Hosts ==
This species infects the lizards Ameiva ameiva, and Cnemidophorus lemniscatus lemniscatus.
