= Plasmodium diminutivum =

Scientific classification
- Domain: Eukaryota
- Clade: Sar
- Clade: Alveolata
- Phylum: Apicomplexa
- Class: Aconoidasida
- Order: Haemospororida
- Family: Plasmodiidae
- Genus: Plasmodium
- Species: P. diminutivum

Binomial name
- Plasmodium diminutivum Telford, 1973

Species of single-celled organism

Plasmodium diminutivum is a parasite of the genus Plasmodium subgenus Carinamoeba.

Like all Plasmodium species P. diminutivum has both vertebrate and insect hosts. The vertebrate hosts for this parasite are reptiles.

== Description ==
This species was described by Telford in 1973.

The parasites have no apparent effect on the host erythrocyte and tend to lie in a polar or lateral position within the host cell. This species appears to infect only mature cells.

The schizonts are initially round to oval but as they mature become fan shaped with a pigment mass forming the handle of the fan. Mature schizonts measure 4.1 +/- 0.2 (range: 3–4) micrometres x 3.1 +/- 0.1 (range: (3–4) micrometres and contain 4-6 merozoites.

Mature gametocytes are round to oval and measure 5.6 +/- 0.2 (range: 5–7) micrometres x 4.8 +/- 0.2 (range: 4–6) micrometres. Vacuoles are rarely seen.

== Geographical occurrence ==
This species occurs in Panama.

== Clinical features and host pathology ==
The only known host is the lizard Ameiva ameiva.
