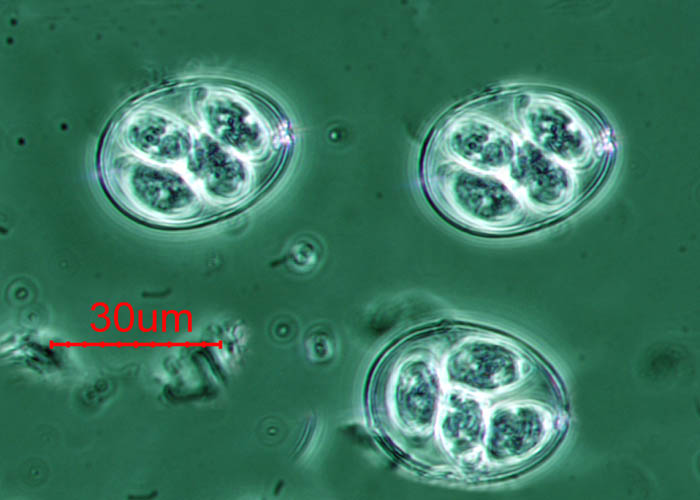
- Eimeria maxima oocysts

Scientific classification
- Domain: Eukaryota
- Clade: Sar
- Clade: Alveolata
- Phylum: Apicomplexa
- Class: Conoidasida
- Order: Eucoccidiorida
- Suborder: Eimeriorina
- Family: Eimeriidae; Minchin, 1903

= Eimeriidae =

Family of single-celled organisms

Eimeriidae is a family of Apicomplexa. It contains the following genera:

- Acroeimeria Paperna & Landsberg, 1989
- Alveocystis Bel'tenev, 1980
- Caryospora Léger, 1904
- Cyclospora Schneider, 1881
- Diaspora Léger, 1898
- Dorisa Levine, 1979
- Eimeria Schneider, 1875
- Epieimeria Dyková & Lom, 1981
- Gousseffia Levine & Ivens, 1979
- Hoarella Arcay de Peraza, 1963
- Isospora Schneider, 1881
- Mantonella Vincent, 1936
- Octosporella Ray & Ragavachari, 1942
- Pfeifferinella von Wasielewski, 1904
- Polysporella McQuistion, 1990
- Pythonella Ray & Das Gupta, 1937
- Sivatoshella Ray & Sarkar, 1968

== Taxonomy ==
The biliary Eimeria-like coccidia of reptiles are classified into the genus Choleoeimeria and form a sister clade to the family Eimeriidae.
