= Plasmodium carmelinoi =

Scientific classification
- Domain: Eukaryota
- Clade: Sar
- Clade: Alveolata
- Phylum: Apicomplexa
- Class: Aconoidasida
- Order: Haemospororida
- Family: Plasmodiidae
- Genus: Plasmodium
- Species: P. carmelinoi

Binomial name
- Plasmodium carmelinoi Lainson, Franco & da Matta, 2010

Species of single-celled organism

Plasmodium carmelinoi is a parasite of the genus Plasmodium.

Like all Plasmodium species P. carmelinoi has both vertebrate and insect hosts. The vertebrate hosts for this parasite are reptiles.

== Description ==
The parasite was first described by Lainson et al in 2010.

== Geographical occurrence ==
This parasite is found in Brazil.

== Vectors ==
Not known.

== Clinical features and host pathology ==
Plasmodium carmelinoi infects the teiid lizard (Ameiva ameiva).
