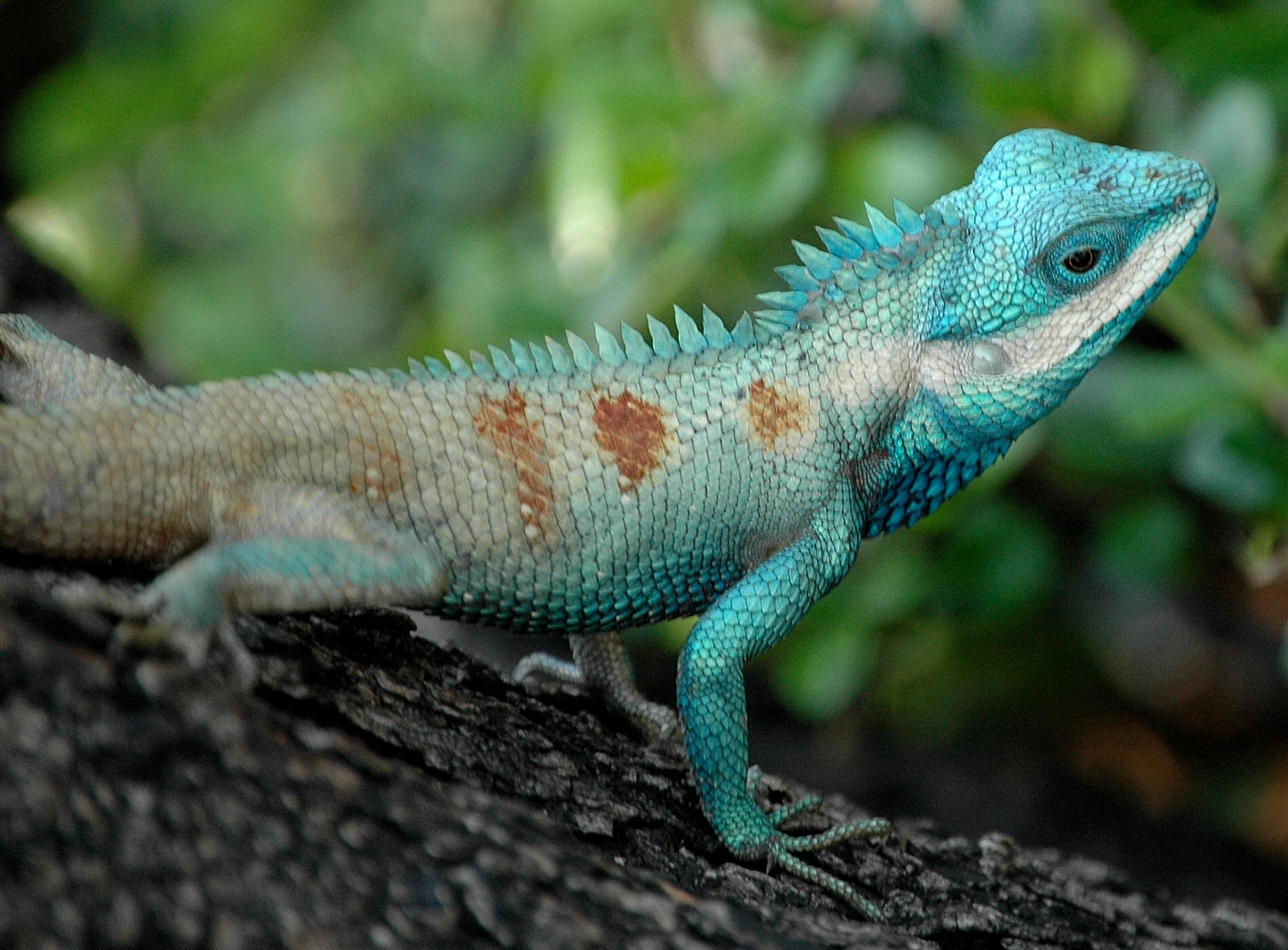
- Calotes mystaceus

Conservation status
- Least Concern (IUCN 3.1)

Scientific classification
- Kingdom: Animalia
- Phylum: Chordata
- Class: Reptilia
- Order: Squamata
- Suborder: Iguania
- Family: Agamidae
- Genus: Calotes
- Species: C. mystaceus

Binomial name
- Calotes mystaceus Duméril & Bibron, 1837

= Calotes mystaceus =

Indo-Chinese forest lizard

Species of lizard

Calotes mystaceus, the Indo-Chinese forest lizard or blue crested lizard, is an agamid lizard found in China, South Asia and Southeast Asia.

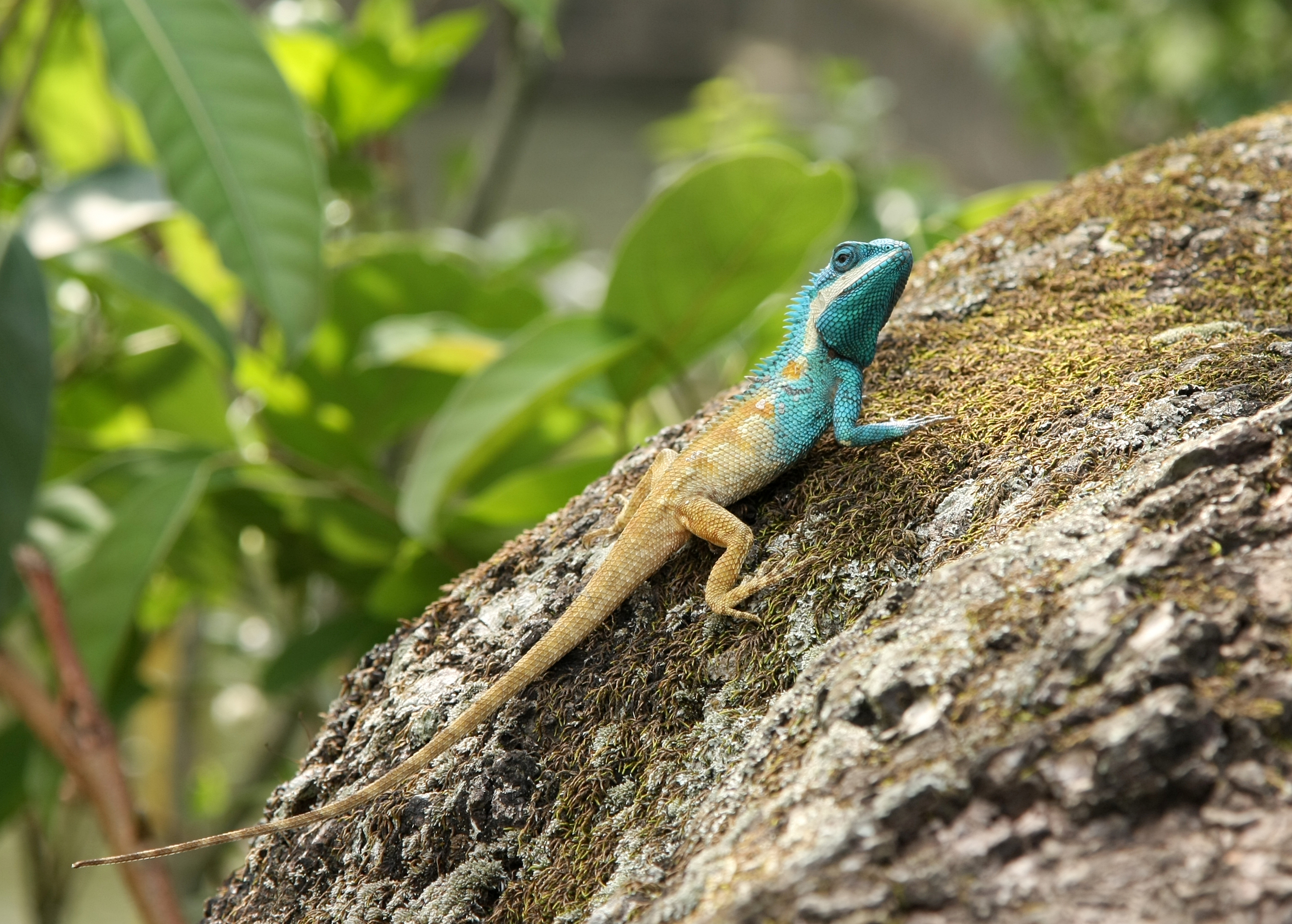
Calotes mystaceus in Keibul Lamjao National Park, India.

== Description and identification ==
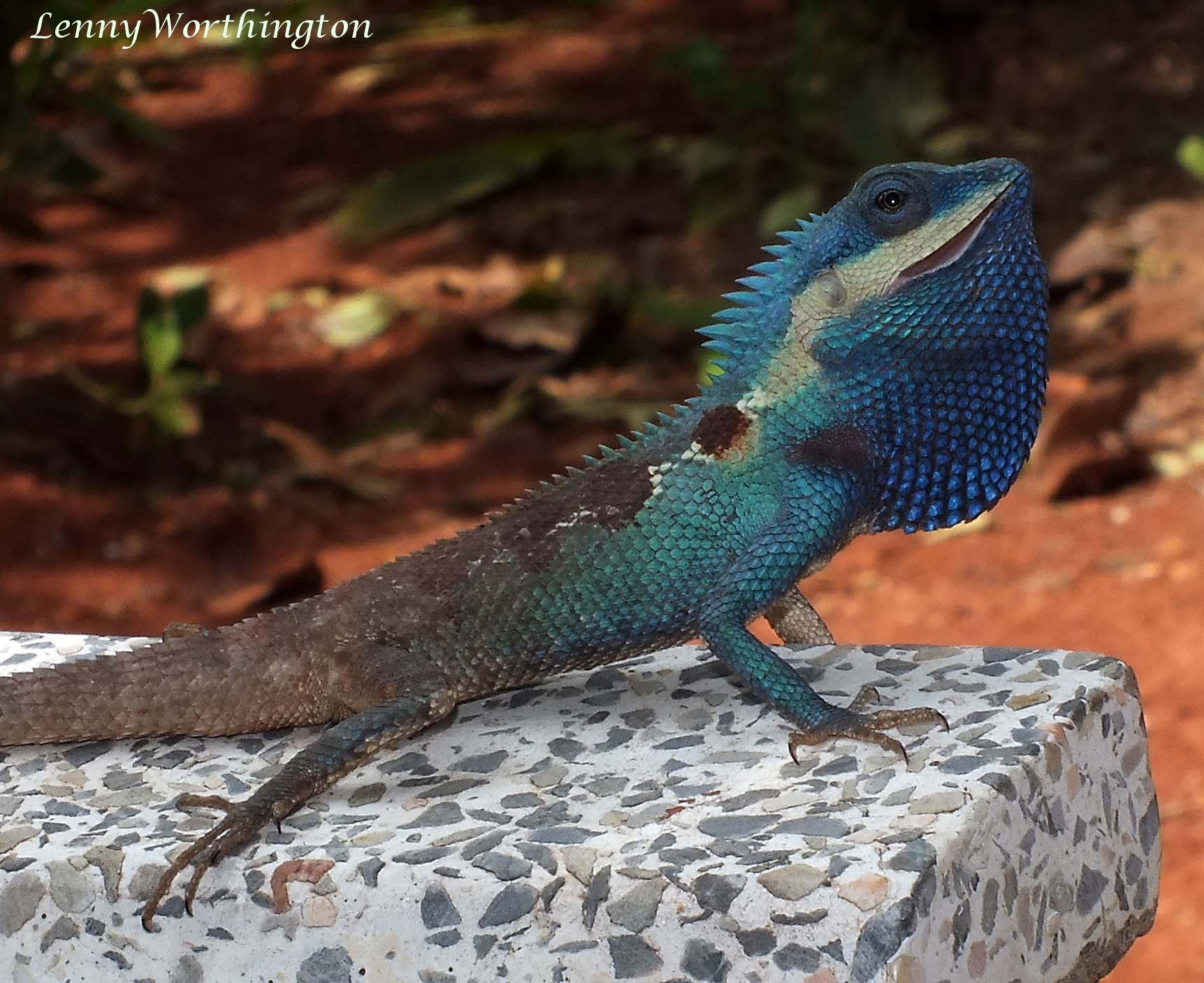
Thailand.

Physical Structure: Upper head-scales smooth or feebly keeled, imbricate, scarcely enlarged on supraorbital region; a few small spines on each side of the head above the tympanum; latter measuring at least half the diameter of the orbit. Gular sac small; gular scales feebly keeled, as large as dorsals. An oblique fold in front of the shoulder. Dorso-nuchal crest well developed in the male, composed of falciform spines directed backwards, the longest measuring the diameter of the orbit; it gradually decreases in height on the back, being reduced to a mere denticulation on the sacrum. 45-53 scales round the middle of the body; dorsal scales keeled, nearly twice as large as ventrals, all directed upwards and backwards; ventral scales strongly keeled. The adpressed hind limb reaches the tympanum or the posterior border of the orbit; fourth finger slightly longer than the third. Tail a little compressed, at the base with a slightly serrated upper ridge.

Color Pattern: Background color grey to olive, frequently with large transverse red spots on the back; lips yellowish.

Length: Maximum: 42 cm. Common: 28 cm. (Snout to vent 9.5 cm).

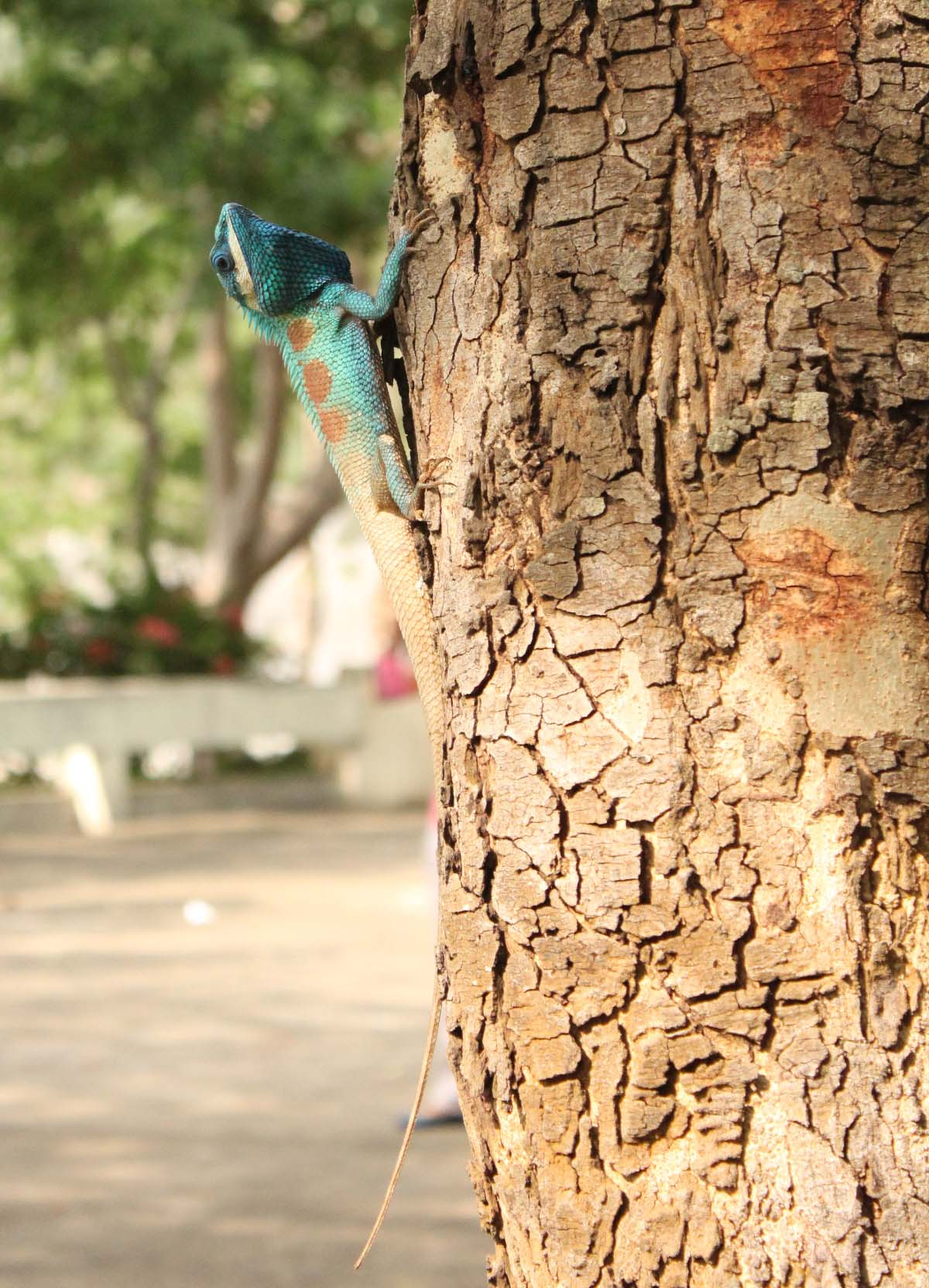
Male Calotes mystaceus from Thailand

== Distribution ==
Cambodia, China (Yunnan), India (Mizoram), Laos, Myanmar (Tenasserim to Naypyitaw = Naypyitaw, Mandalay, and Kachin State [26°00N, 97°30E]), Thailand (Chiang Saen) (north of the Isthmus of Kra), & Vietnam (South). It is also reported from Bangladesh (Chittagong Hill Tracts), adjacent to Mizoram province of India.

== Vernacular names ==
- Bengali: নীল-মাথা গিরিগিটি, romanized: Neel-matha girigiti or নীলা রক্তচোষা (proposed)
- Burmese: ပုတ်သင်ညို, romanized: Pote Thin Nyo
- Chinese: 白唇树蜥
- English: Blue-crested lizard, Indo-Chinese bloodsucker, Indo-Chinese forest lizard, White-lipped calotes
- Hindi: girgit
- Khmer: បង្គួយក្បាលខៀវខាងលិចទន្លេមេគង្គ
- Lao: ກະປອມ, romanized: gabpom
- Thai: กะปอม, romanized: gabpawm or กิ้งก่า, (ginggaa)

== Habitat ==
Terrestrial & arboreal; diurnal; naturally found in forest, but can be found in treed neighborhoods and city parks.

== Diet ==
Feeds on crickets, grasshoppers, moths, and other insects.

== Reproduction ==
The Indo-Chinese forest lizard is oviparous.

== Uses ==
No known practical uses. Plays an insectivorous role in its ecosystem.

== Threat to humans ==
Non-venomous and harmless to humans. Can give a painful bite if handled, but is not dangerous.
