= Pfeifferinella =

Scientific classification
- Domain: Eukaryota
- Clade: Sar
- Superphylum: Alveolata
- Phylum: Apicomplexa
- Class: Conoidasida
- Order: Eucoccidiorida
- Family: Eimeriidae
- Genus: Pfeifferinella; Wasielewski, 1904

Species
- Pfeifferinella egypti Pfeifferinella ellipsoides Pfeifferinella gugleri Pfeifferinella impudica Pfeifferinella macrocoronata

Genus of single-celled organisms

Pfeifferinella is a genus of parasitic alveolates in the phylum Apicomplexa. This genus has been poorly studied and little is known about it. Species in this genus infect marine priapulid worms and terrestrial and freshwater gastropods.

== History ==
This genus was described by Wasielewski in 1904.

== Taxonomy ==
The type species is Pfeifferinella ellipsoides.

Six species are currently recognised in this genus.

== Description ==
The majority of species have developmental stages undergo merogony, gamogony and sporogony within the digestive gland of gastropod host. The oocysts are passed in the faeces.

The oocysts lack sporocysts. Each oocyst have 8-14 free sporozoites. A large oocyst residuum is present. The micropyle tends to be large.
