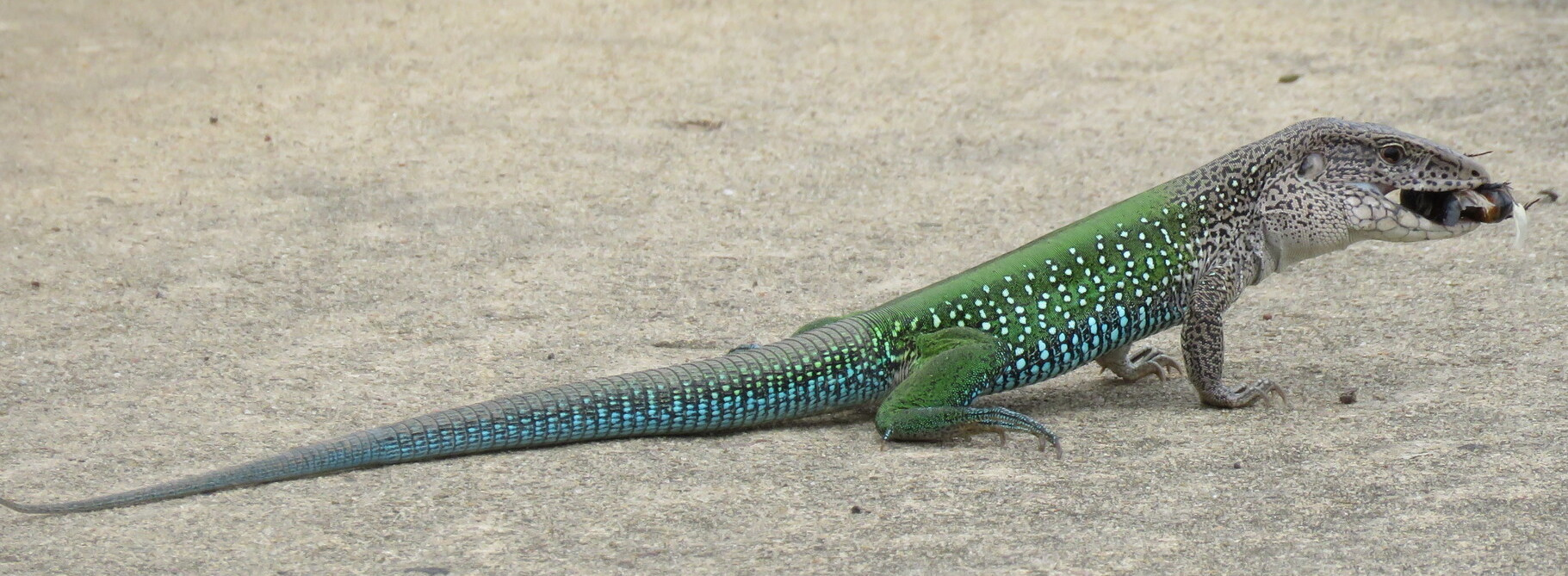
- Adult, eating a bee
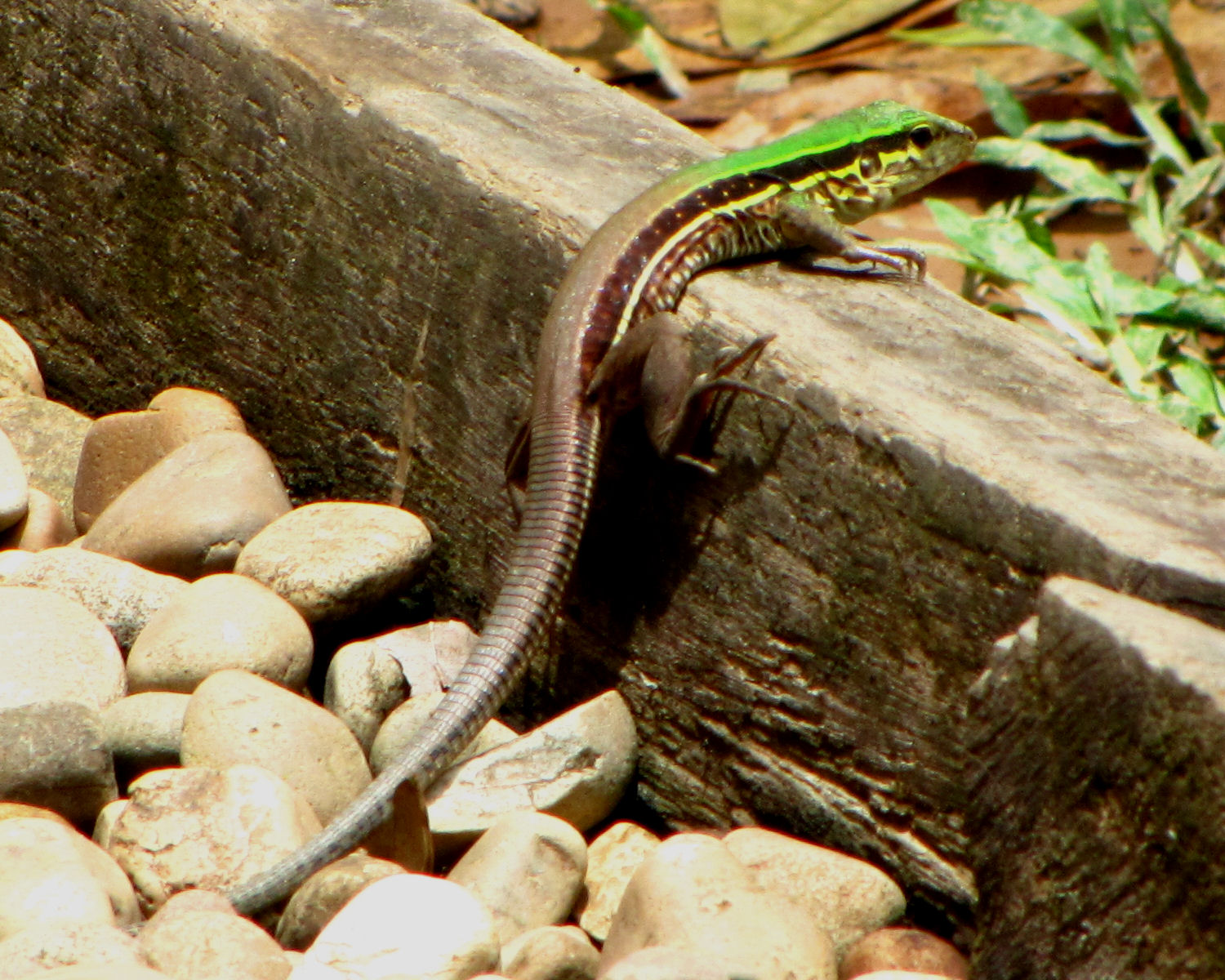
- Juvenile

Scientific classification
- Kingdom: Animalia
- Phylum: Chordata
- Class: Reptilia
- Order: Squamata
- Family: Teiidae
- Genus: Ameiva
- Species: A. ameiva

Binomial name
- Ameiva ameiva (Linnaeus, 1758)

Subspecies
- Ameiva ameiva ameiva Ameiva ameiva fischeri Ameiva ameiva fulginosa Ameiva ameiva laeta Ameiva ameiva melanocephala Ameiva ameiva ornata Ameiva ameiva petersi Ameiva ameiva praesignis Ameiva ameiva vogli

Synonyms
- List: Lacerta ameiva Linnaeus, 1758; Ameiva ameiva bilineata; Ameiva ameiva petersi; Ameiva americana; Ameiva bifrontata; Ameiva guttata; Ameiva litterata; Ameiva panchlora; Ameiva pleurotaenia; Ameiva surinamensis; Ameiva surinamensis var. aquilina; Ameiva surinamensis var. atrigularis; Ameiva vulgaris; Cnemidophorus maculatus; Lacerta ameiva; Lacerta graphica; Lacerta litterata; Lacerta tristriata; Seps surinamensis; Teius tritaeniatus

= Ameiva ameiva =

Species of lizard

Ameiva ameiva, also known as the giant ameiva, green ameiva, South American ground lizard, or Amazon racerunner, is a species of lizard in the family Teiidae found in Central America, South America, and some Caribbean Islands.

== Geographic range ==
It is widespread in Central America and South America, including: Panama, Brazil, Colombia, Surinam, French Guiana, Guyana, Venezuela, Bolivia, Ecuador, Peru, Argentina, and Paraguay. It is also found on the Caribbean islands of Trinidad and Tobago, Grenada, the Grenadines, Barbados, Dominica, St Kitts and Nevis, Margarita, Swan Island, and Isla de la Providencia. It was also once present on Saint Vincent but has since been extirpated.

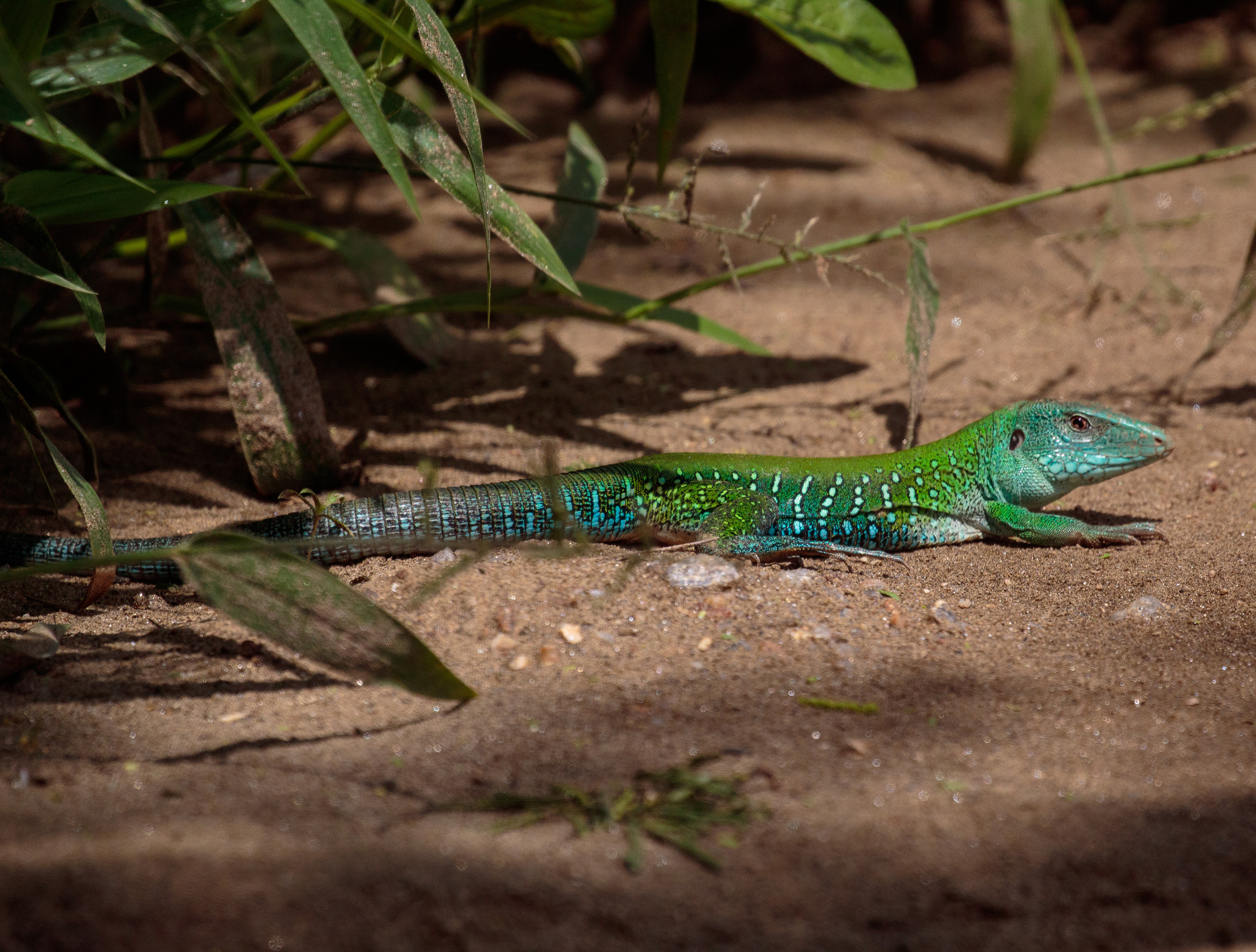
In Brazil

== Description ==
Ameiva ameiva has a streamlined body, pointed head, slightly forked tongue, and muscular hind legs. They grow to approximately 45–50 cm (18–20 in). Both sexes have random black specks and mottling along the sides. Females usually have much less green than males and a more dusty green color. Males have vibrant green coloration and more bold mottling. Males also have more expanded jowls. They are popular pets because of the male's striking green coloration.

== Habitat ==
They live on the forest floor, often sheltering underneath logs and in leaf litter. Captive individuals have been observed making tunnels spanning out from under a log or rock when given enough soil.

== Diet ==
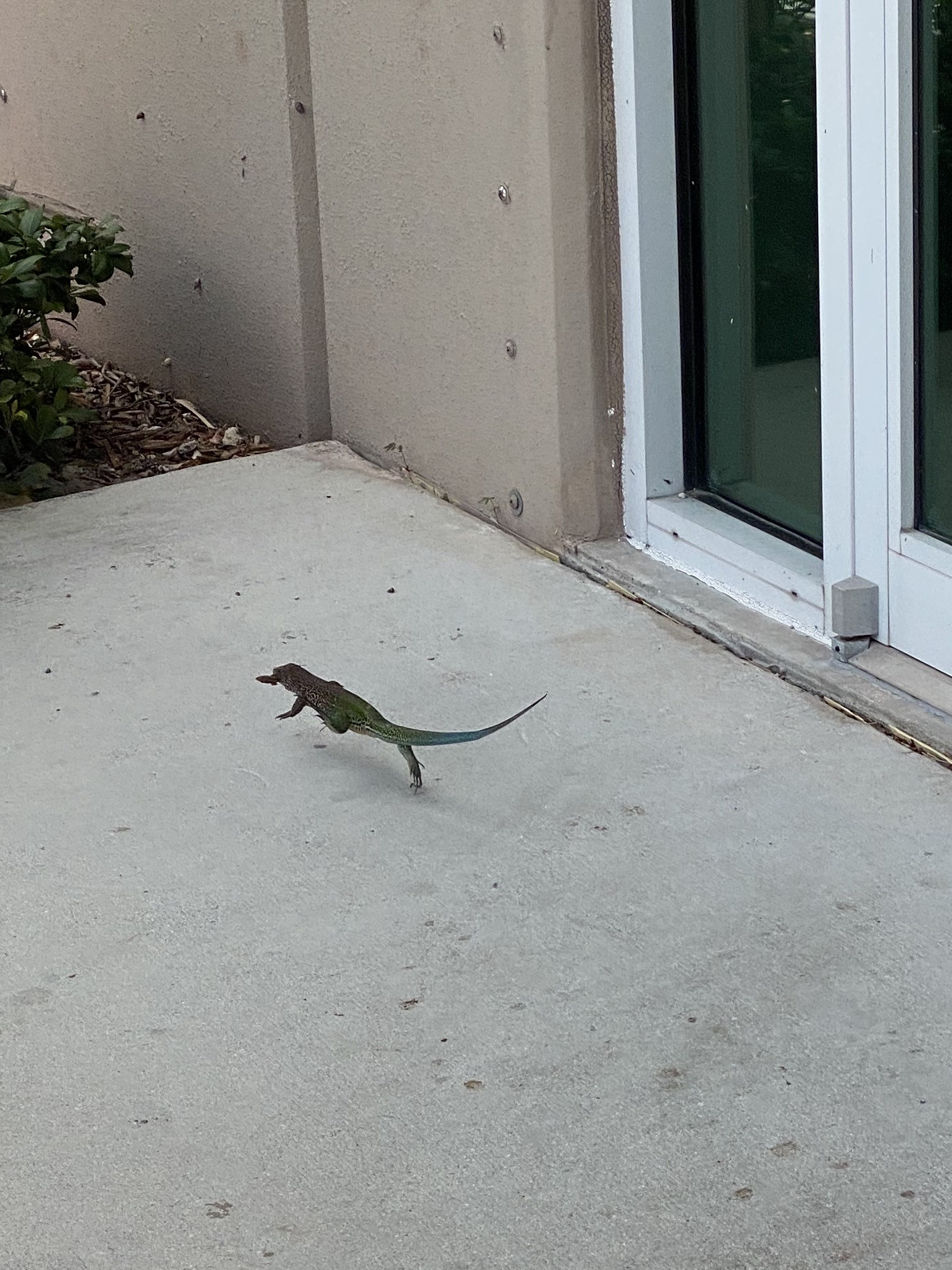
Running with an anole in its mouth

Its diet consists of mainly insects (such as grasshoppers, butterflies, cockroaches, mole crickets, beetles, termites, and insect larvae), frogs, other lizards (such as anoles, dwarf geckos, skinks, and even conspecifics), amphisbaenians, spiders, snails, and plant matter.

== Reproduction ==
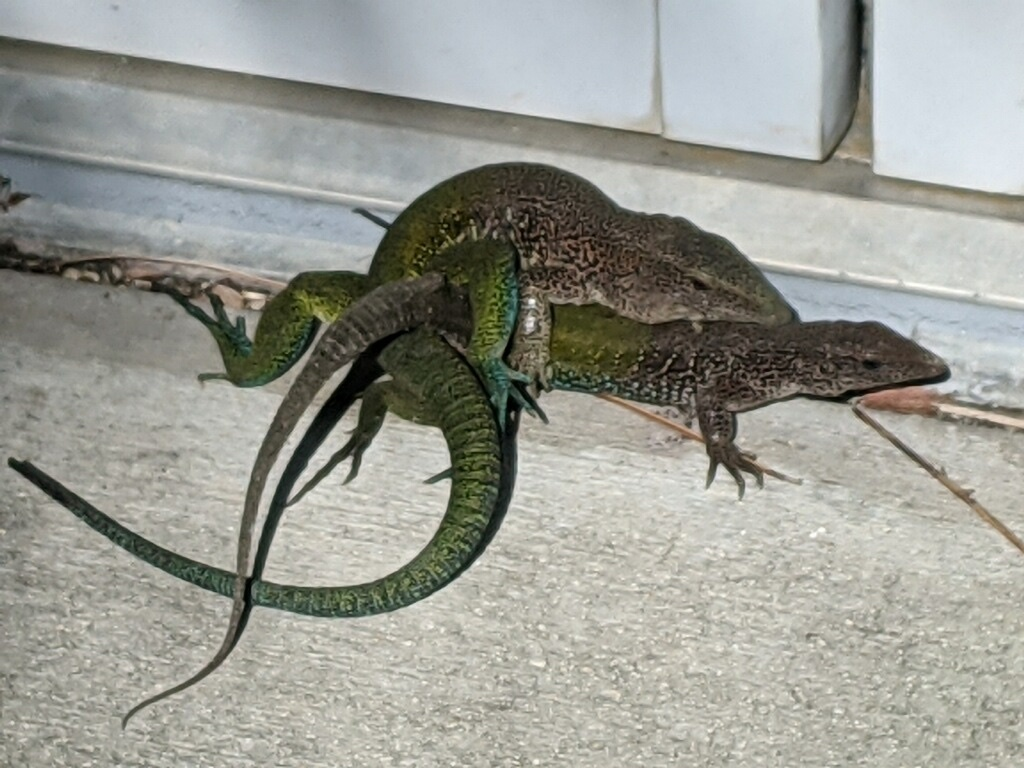
Mating

The female lays several clutches of eggs from March to December.

== Invasive species ==
This species has been introduced into the United States with thriving populations in south Florida.

== Parasites ==
This species is infected by a number of protist parasites including:

- Acroeimeria pintoi
- Choleoeimeria carinii
- Plasmodium attenuatum
- P. carmelinoi
- P. cnemidophori
- P. diminutivum
- P. minasense
- P. pifanoi
- P. telfordi
- Sarcocystis ameivamastigodryasi

== Predation ==
Giant ameivas are prey for juveniles and subadults of Amazon tree boas.

== Bibliography ==
- Malhotra, Anita; Thorpe, Roger S. (1999). Reptiles & Amphibians of the Eastern Caribbean. Macmillan Education Ltd. pp. 101, 104, 106. ISBN 0-333-69141-5.
