= Polysporella =

Scientific classification
- Domain: Eukaryota
- Clade: Sar
- Superphylum: Alveolata
- Phylum: Apicomplexa
- Class: Conoidasida
- Order: Eucoccidiorida
- Family: Eimeriidae
- Genus: Polysporella; McQuiston, 1990
- Species: P. genovesae

Binomial name
- Polysporella genovesae McQuiston, 1990

Genus of single-celled organisms

Polysporella is a genus in the phylum Apicomplexa. Species in this genus infect birds. This genus has been poorly studied and little is known about it.

== History ==
This genus was created by McQuistion in 1990.

== Taxonomy ==
Only one species, Polysporella genovesae, is currently recognised in this genus.

== Description ==
The oocysts each have 9-15 sporocysts. Each sporocyst have 2 sporozoites.
