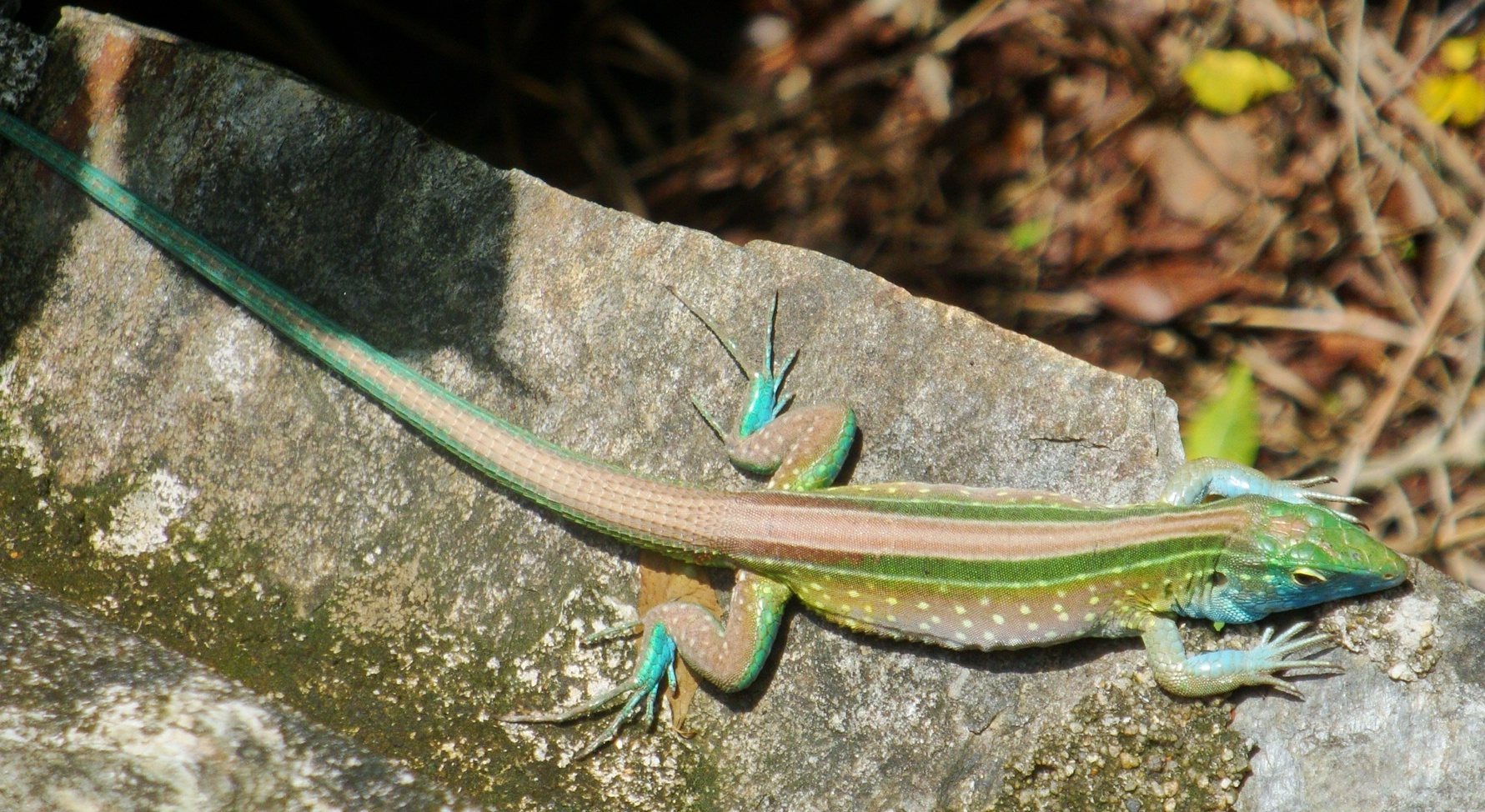
- Tayrona National Natural Park, Magdalena Department, Colombia

Conservation status
- Least Concern (IUCN 3.1)

Scientific classification
- Kingdom: Animalia
- Phylum: Chordata
- Class: Reptilia
- Order: Squamata
- Suborder: Lacertoidea
- Family: Teiidae
- Genus: Cnemidophorus
- Species: C. lemniscatus

Binomial name
- Cnemidophorus lemniscatus (Linnaeus, 1758)

= Rainbow whiptail =

Species of lizard

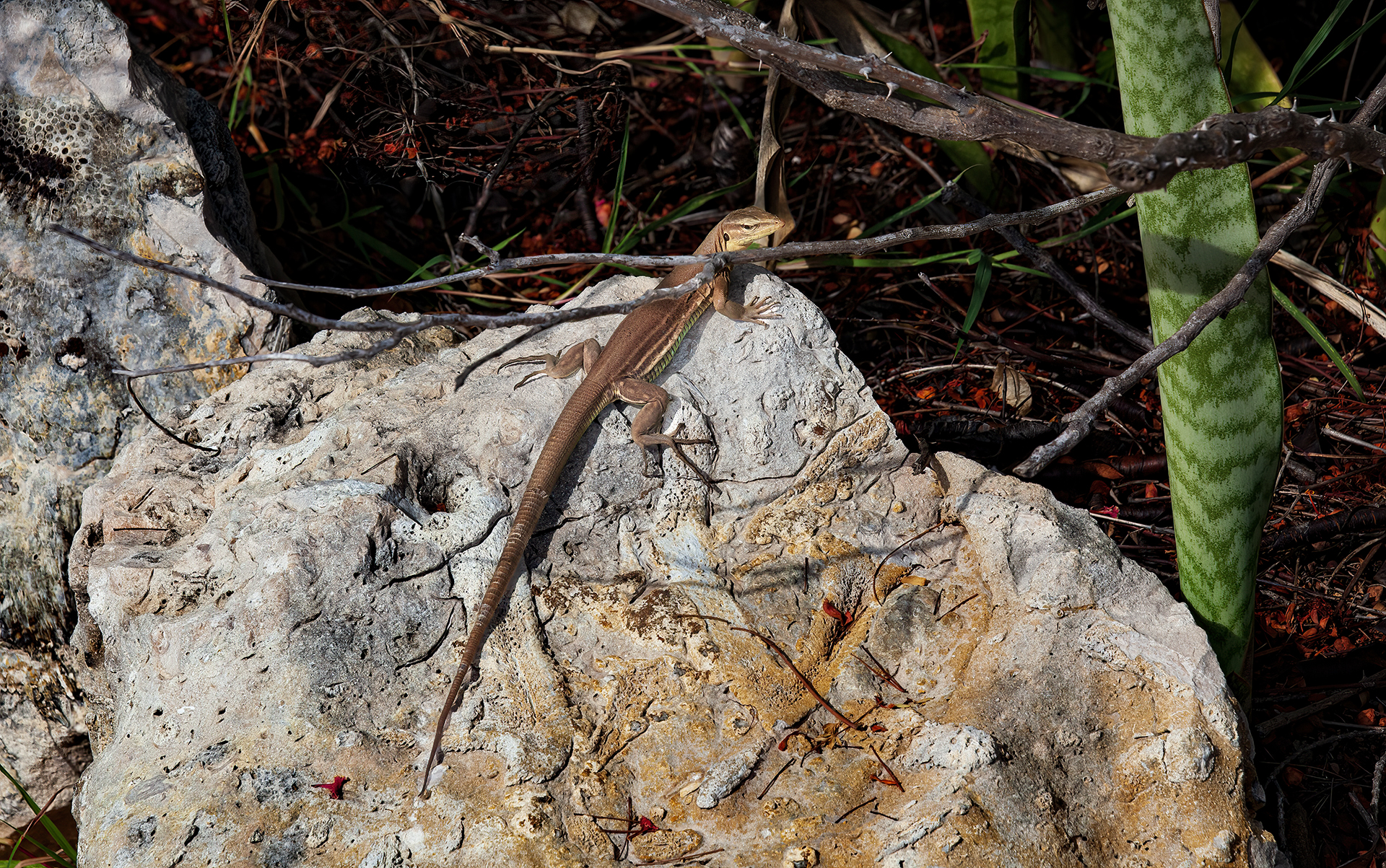
A juvenile female Rainbow Whiptail lizard. Curacao.

The rainbow whiptail (Cnemidophorus lemniscatus) is a species of lizard found in Central America, the Caribbean, and northern South America. It has also been introduced in Florida and has established populations there. A rainbow whiptail grows up to approximately 12 inches (30.5 cm).

Both sexually reproducing and parthenogenetic populations are known.

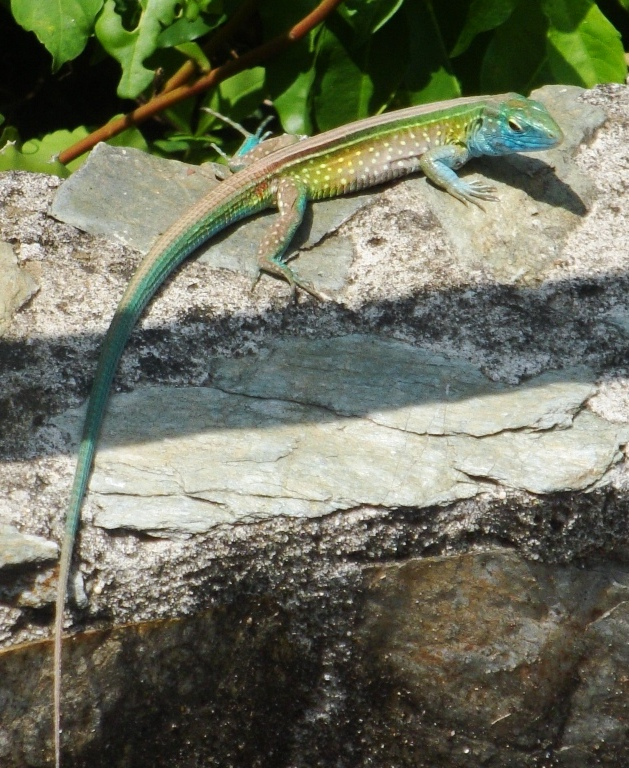
Tayrona National Natural Park, Colombia

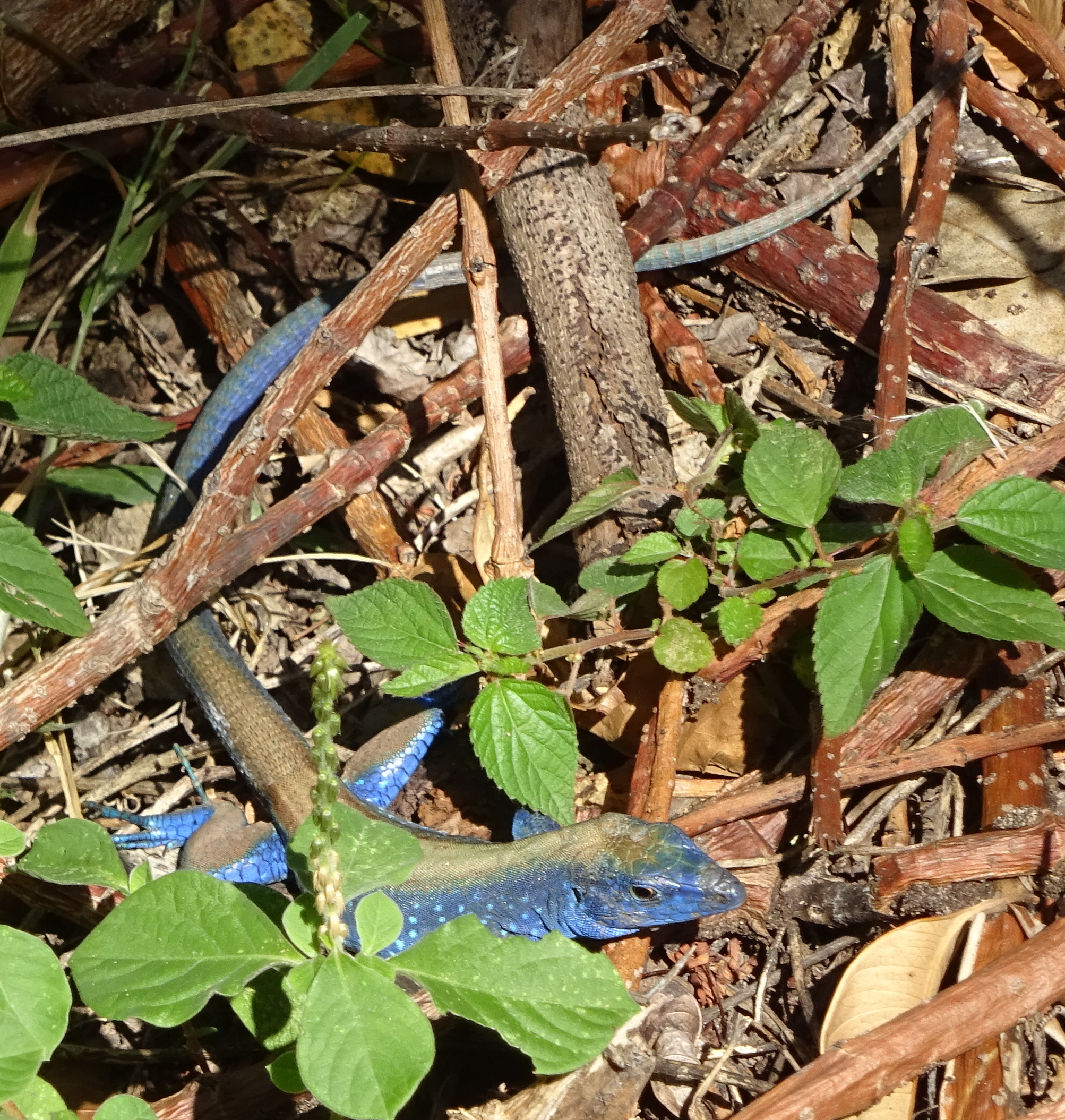
Blue specimen in Providencia Island, Colombia

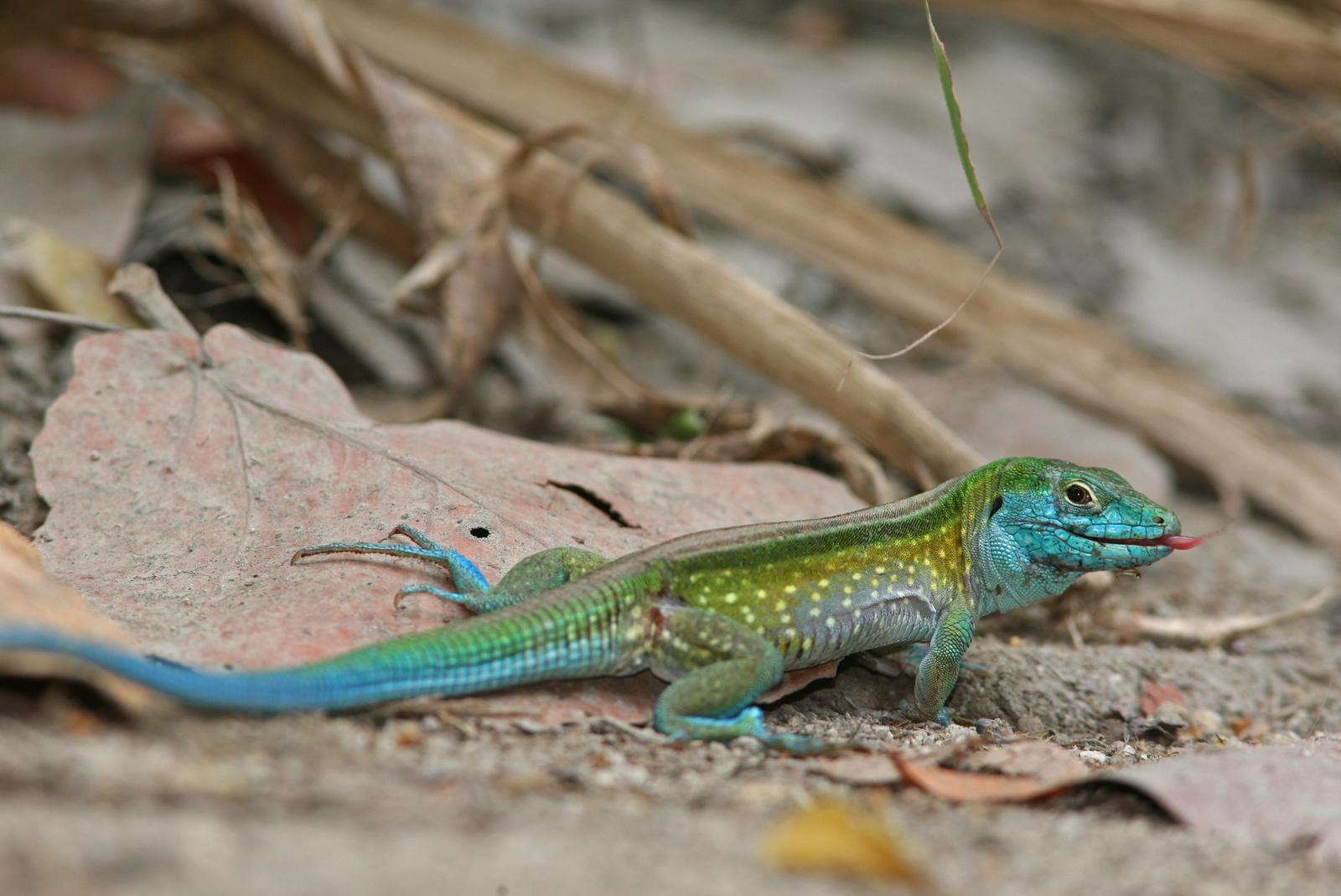
Tayrona National Natural Park, Colombia

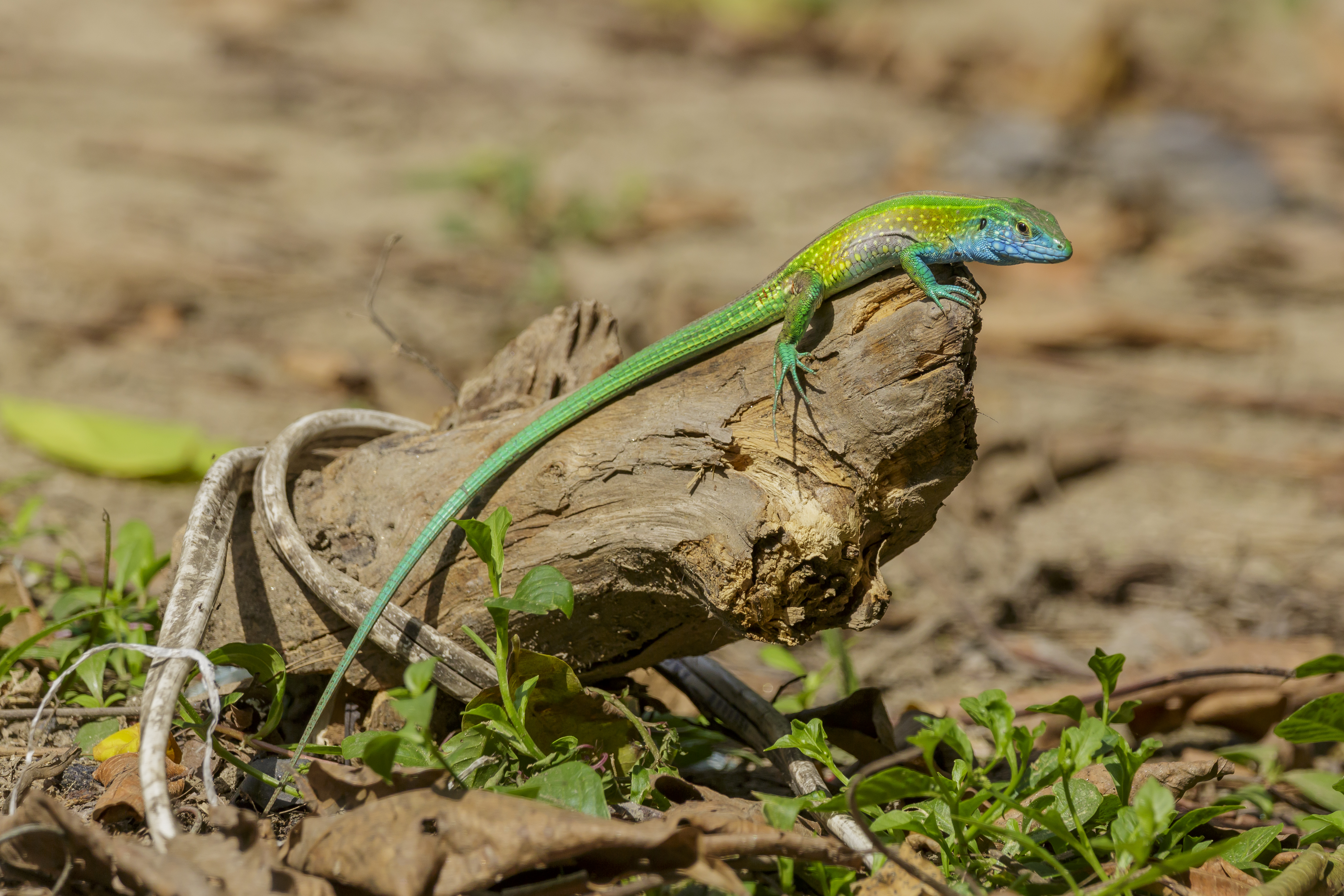
Rainbow whiptail at Tayrona Natural Park.

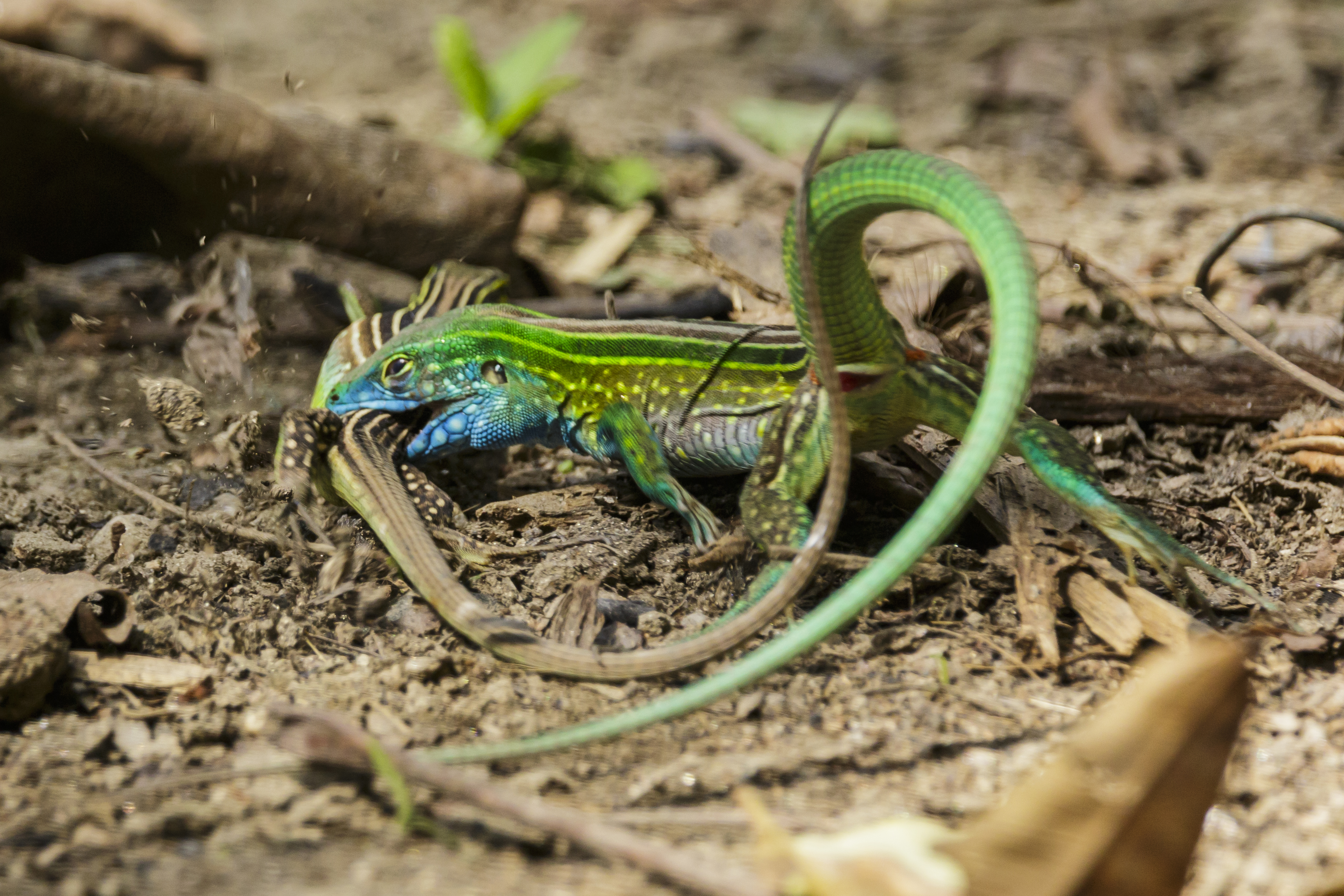
Struggle between two Cnemidophorus lemniscatus.
