= Marmorosphax tricolor =

Conservation status
- Least Concern (IUCN 3.1)

Scientific classification
- Kingdom: Animalia
- Phylum: Chordata
- Class: Reptilia
- Order: Squamata
- Family: Scincidae
- Genus: Marmorosphax
- Species: M. tricolor

Binomial name
- Marmorosphax tricolor (Bavay, 1869)
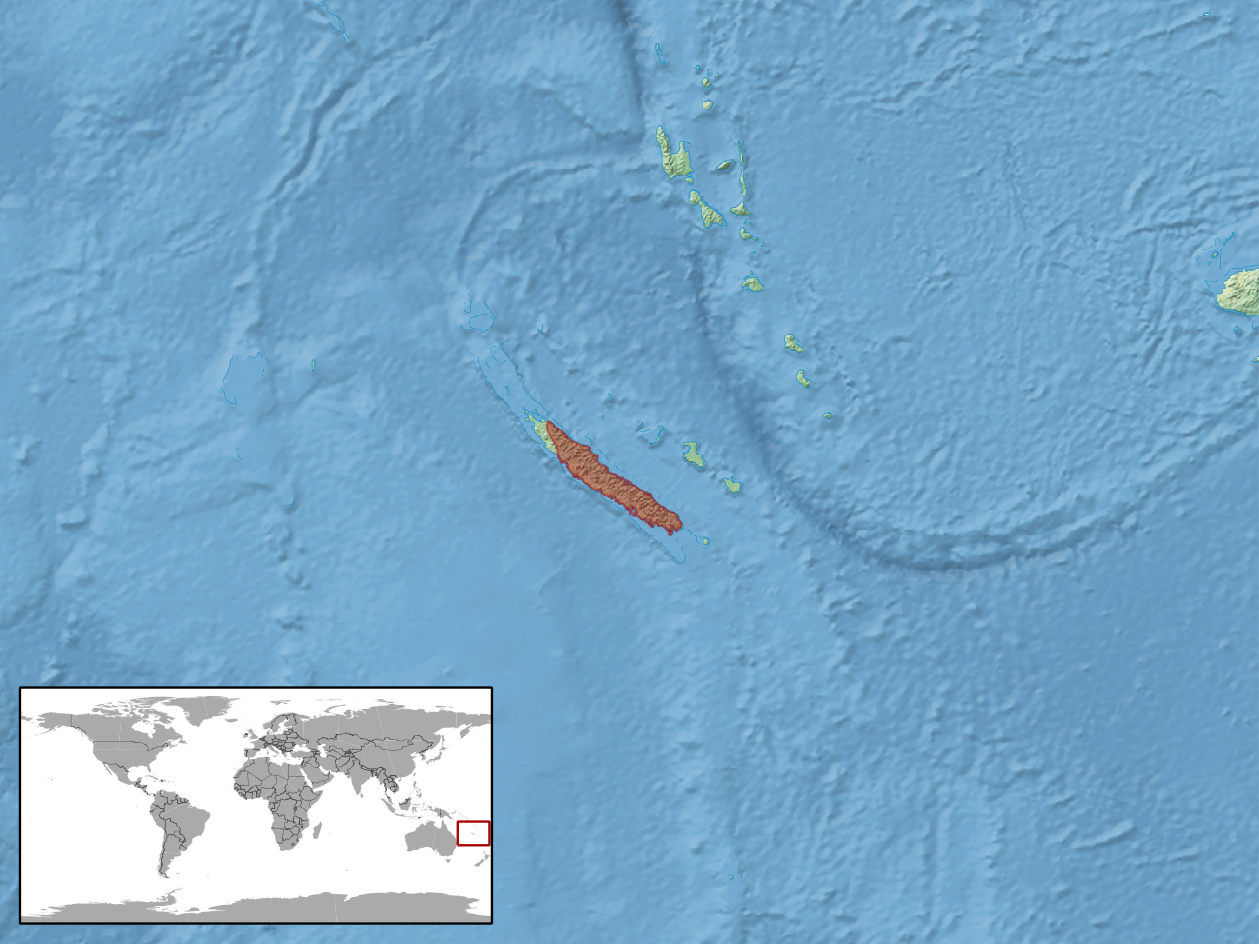

Species of lizard

Marmorosphax tricolor, marble-throated skink, is a species of skink found in New Caledonia.
