= Stieda body =

The Stieda body is an organelle located at the polar region of the sporocyst of some coccidia visible with electron microscopy. It appears as a knob like structure and is a plug occluding a hole in the sporocyst. The breakdown of this body allows excystation of the sporozoites.
