= Medusa =

Female monster in Greek mythology

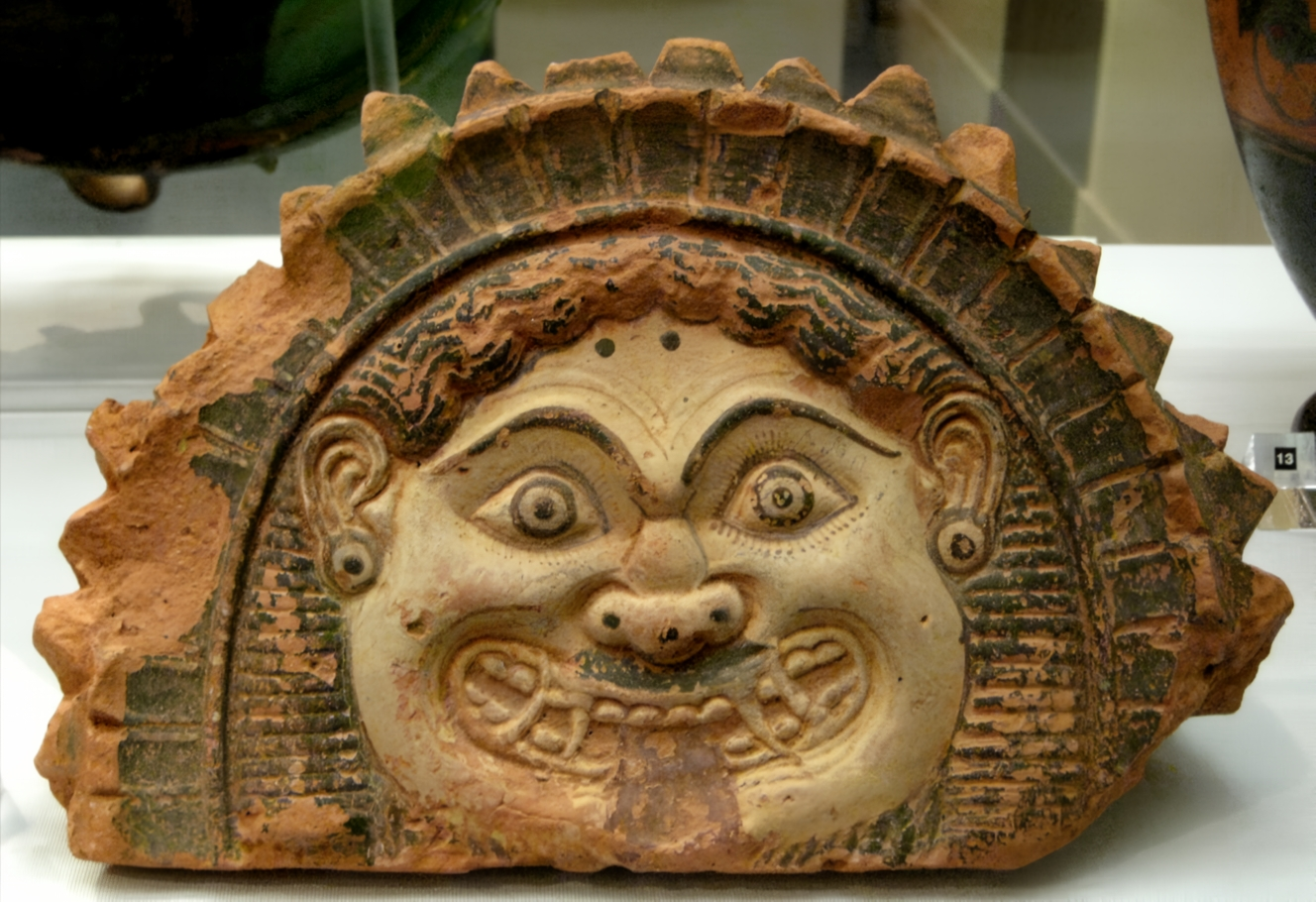
- Classical Greek gorgoneion featuring the head of Medusa; fourth century BC

Genealogy
- Parents: Phorcys and Ceto
- Siblings: The Hesperides, Stheno, Euryale, The Graeae, Thoosa, Scylla, and Ladon
- Children: Pegasus and Chrysaor

In Greek mythology, Medusa (/mɪˈdjuːzə, -sə/; Ancient Greek: Μέδουσα, romanized: Médousa, lit. 'guardian, protectress'), (Note: The feminine present participle of medein, "to protect, rule over" (compare Medon, Medea, Diomedes, etc.). Alternatively, it is from the same root and is formed after the participle.) also called Gorgo (Ancient Greek: Γοργώ) (Note: Gorgṓ, "the grim one". From gorgos, referring to a look or gaze, "grim, fierce, terrible"; later also "vigorous".) or the Gorgon, was one of the three Gorgons. Medusa is generally described as a woman with living snakes in place of hair; her appearance was so hideous that anyone who looked upon her was turned to stone. Medusa and her Gorgon sisters Euryale and Stheno were usually described as daughters of Phorcys and Ceto; of the three, only Medusa was mortal.

Medusa was beheaded by the Greek hero Perseus, who then used her head, which retained its ability to turn onlookers to stone, as a weapon until he gave it to the goddess Athena to place on her shield. In classical antiquity, the image of the head of Medusa appeared in the evil-averting device known as the Gorgoneion.

According to Hesiod and Aeschylus, she lived and died on Sarpedon, somewhere near Cisthene. The 2nd-century BC writer Dionysius Scytobrachion instead placed the Gorgons in modern-day Libya. Herodotus also associated the Gorgons with Libya, reporting traditions that located them there.

== Mythology ==
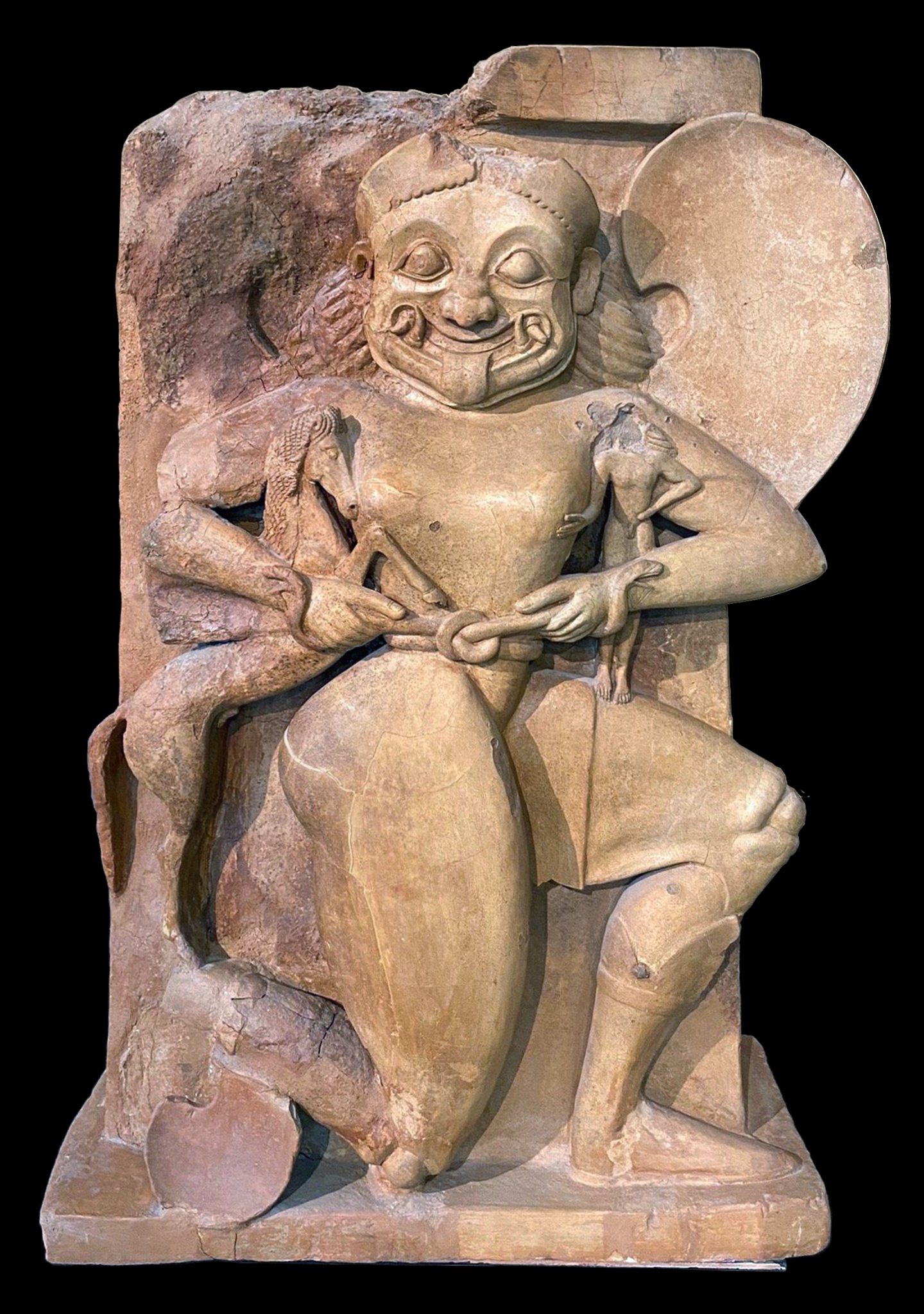
An archaic Medusa, wearing the belt of the intertwined snakes, a fertility symbol, as depicted in an altar from Gela. She embraces her children, the winged horse Pegasus and the giant Chrysaor.

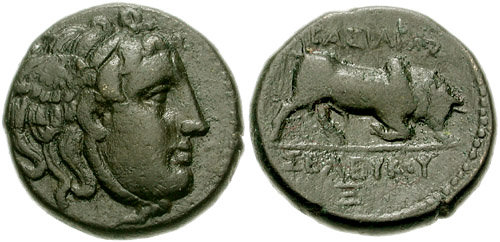
Coins of the reign of Seleucus I Nicator of Syria (312–280 BC)

The three Gorgons—Medusa, Stheno and Euryale—were described by Hesiod and Apollodorus as offspring of the sea-god Phorcys and his sister Ceto; according to Hyginus, however, their parents were "Gorgon" and Ceto. Their genealogy is shared with other sisters, the Graeae, as in Aeschylus's Prometheus Bound, which places both trios of sisters far off "on Kisthene's dreadful plain":

Near them their sisters three, the Gorgons, winged
With snakes for hair—hatred of mortal man

In most versions of the story, Medusa was beheaded by the hero Perseus, who was sent to fetch her head by King Polydectes of Seriphus because Polydectes wanted to marry Perseus's mother. The gods were well aware of this, and Perseus received help. He received a mirrored shield from Athena, sandals with gold wings from Hermes, a sword from Hephaestus and Hades's helm of invisibility. Since Medusa was the only one of the three Gorgons who was mortal, Perseus was able to slay her; he did so while looking at the reflection from the mirrored shield he received from Athena. During that time, Medusa was pregnant by Poseidon. When Perseus beheaded her, Pegasus, a winged horse, and Chrysaor, a giant wielding a golden sword, sprang from her body.

Jane Ellen Harrison argues that "her potency only begins when her head is severed, and that potency resides in the head; she is in a word a mask with a body later appended... the basis of the Gorgoneion is a cultus object, a ritual mask misunderstood." In the Odyssey xi, Homer does not specifically mention the Gorgon Medusa:

Lest for my daring Persephone the dread,
From Hades should send up an awful monster's grisly head.

Harrison's translation states that "the Gorgon was made out of the terror, not the terror out of the Gorgon."

According to Ovid, in northwest Africa, Perseus flew past the Titan Atlas, who stood holding the sky aloft, and transformed Atlas into a stone when Atlas tried to attack him. In a similar manner, the corals of the Red Sea were said to have been formed of Medusa's blood spilled onto seaweed when Perseus laid down the petrifying head beside the shore during his short stay in Ethiopia where he saved and wed the princess Andromeda, the most beautiful woman at that time. Furthermore, the venomous vipers of the Sahara, in the Argonautica 4.1515, Ovid's Metamorphoses 4.770 and Lucan's Pharsalia 9.820, were said to have grown from spilt drops of her blood. The blood of Medusa also spawned the Amphisbaena (a horned dragon-like creature with a snake-headed tail).

Perseus then flew to Seriphos, where his mother was being forced into marriage with the king, Polydectes, who was turned into stone by the head. Then Perseus gave the Gorgon's head to Athena, who placed it on her shield, the Aegis.

While ancient Greek vase-painters and relief carvers imagined Medusa and her sisters as having monstrous form, sculptors and vase-painters of the fifth century BC began to envisage her as being beautiful as well as terrifying. In an ode written in 490 BC, Pindar already speaks of "fair-cheeked Medusa".

In a late version of the Medusa myth, by the Roman poet Ovid, Medusa was originally a beautiful maiden, but when Neptune (the Roman equivalent of the Greek Poseidon) mated with her in the temple of Minerva (the Roman equivalent of the Greek Athena), the goddess punished Medusa by transforming her beautiful hair into horrible snakes. Although no earlier versions mention this, ancient depictions of Medusa as a beautiful maiden instead of a horrid monster predate Ovid. In classical Greek art, the depiction of Medusa shifted from hideous beast to an attractive young woman, both aggressor and victim, a tragic figure in her death. The earliest of those depictions comes courtesy of Polygnotus, who drew Medusa as a comely woman sleeping peacefully as Perseus beheads her. As the act of killing a beautiful maiden in her sleep is rather unheroic, it is not clear whether those vases are meant to elicit sympathy for Medusa's fate, or to mock the traditional hero.

Some classical references refer to three Gorgons; Harrison considered that the tripling of Medusa into a trio of sisters was a secondary feature in the myth:

The triple form is not primitive, it is merely an instance of a general tendency... which makes of each woman goddess a trinity, which has given us the Horae, the Charites, the Semnai, and a host of other triple groups. It is immediately obvious that the Gorgons are not really three but one + two. The two unslain sisters are mere appendages due to custom; the real Gorgon is Medusa.

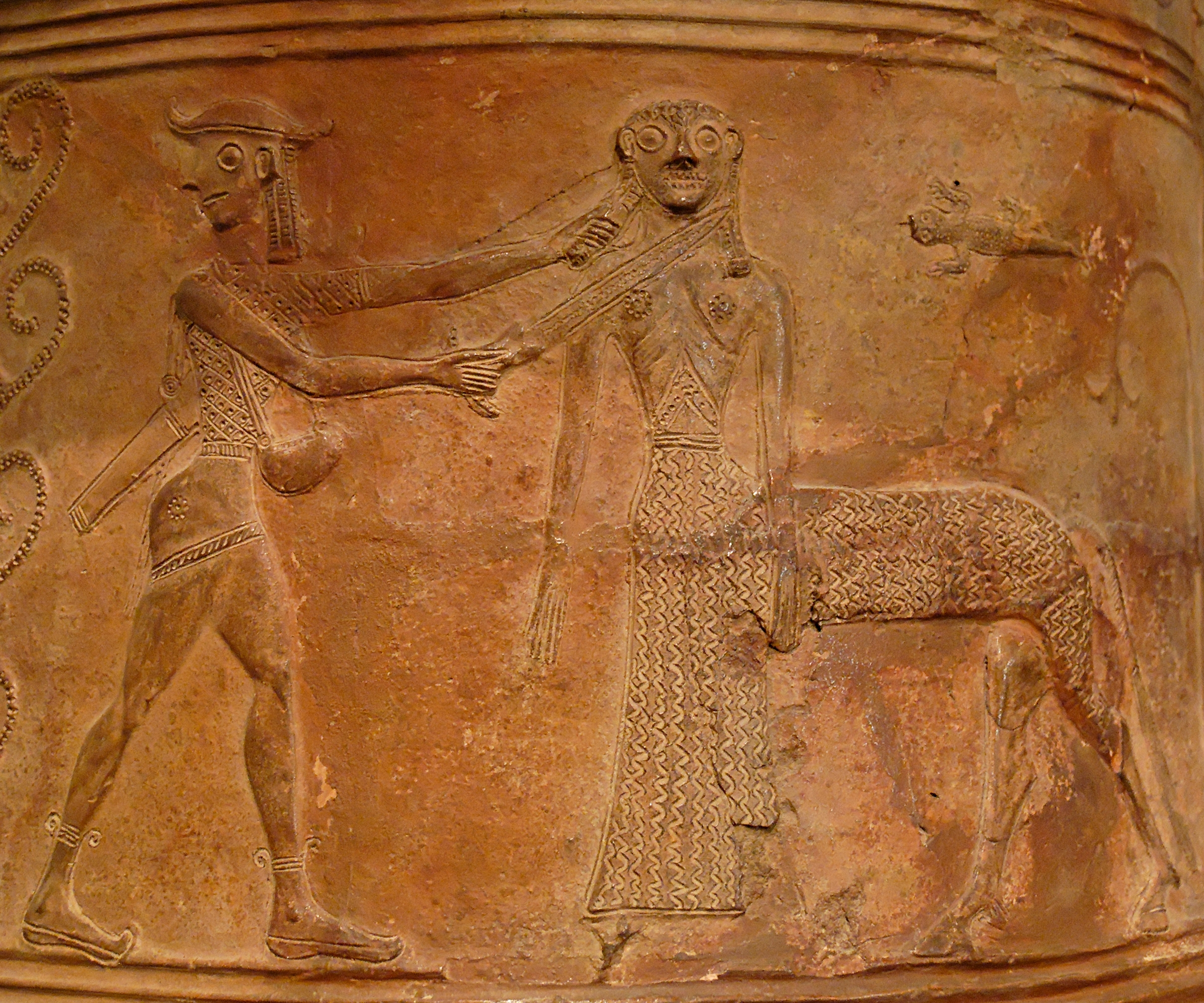
Medusa, depicted as a centaur, is beheaded by Perseus, Boeotian pithos, c. 660 BC.

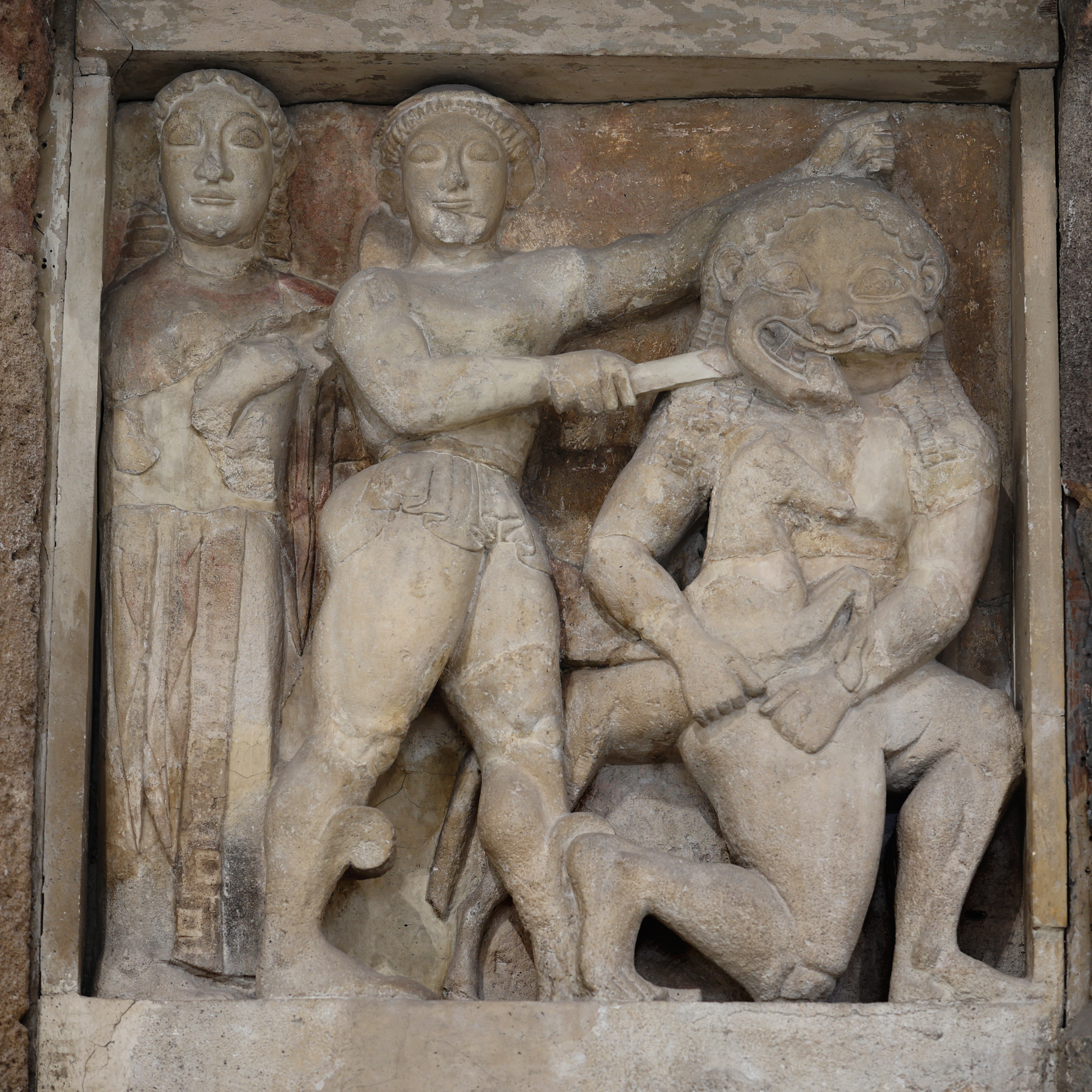
Perseus decapitating Medusa while Athena looks on, from a preserved metope from the temple of Apollo in Selinus

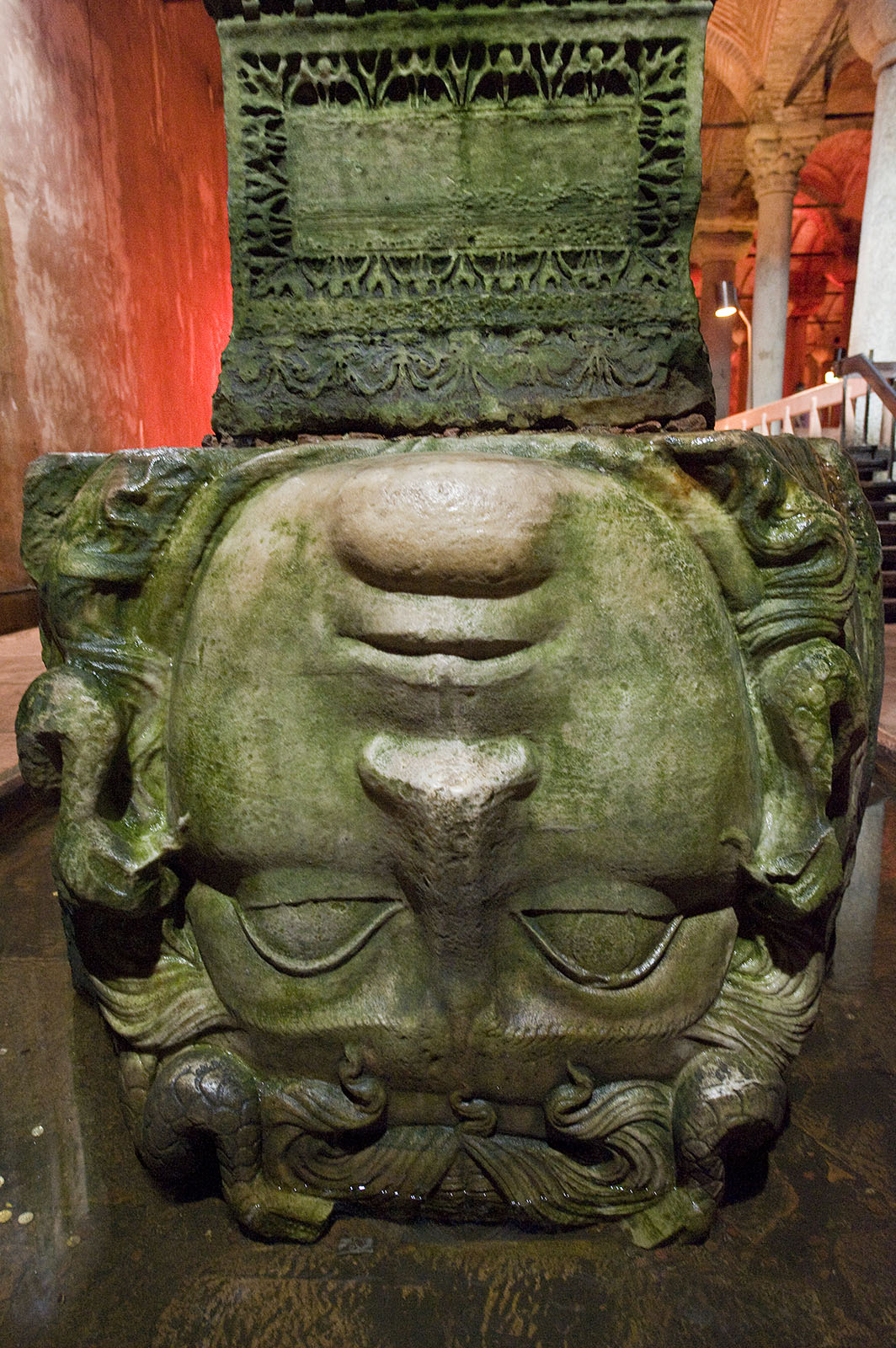
An ancient Roman carving of the Medusa, now a spolia in use as a column base in the Basilica Cistern

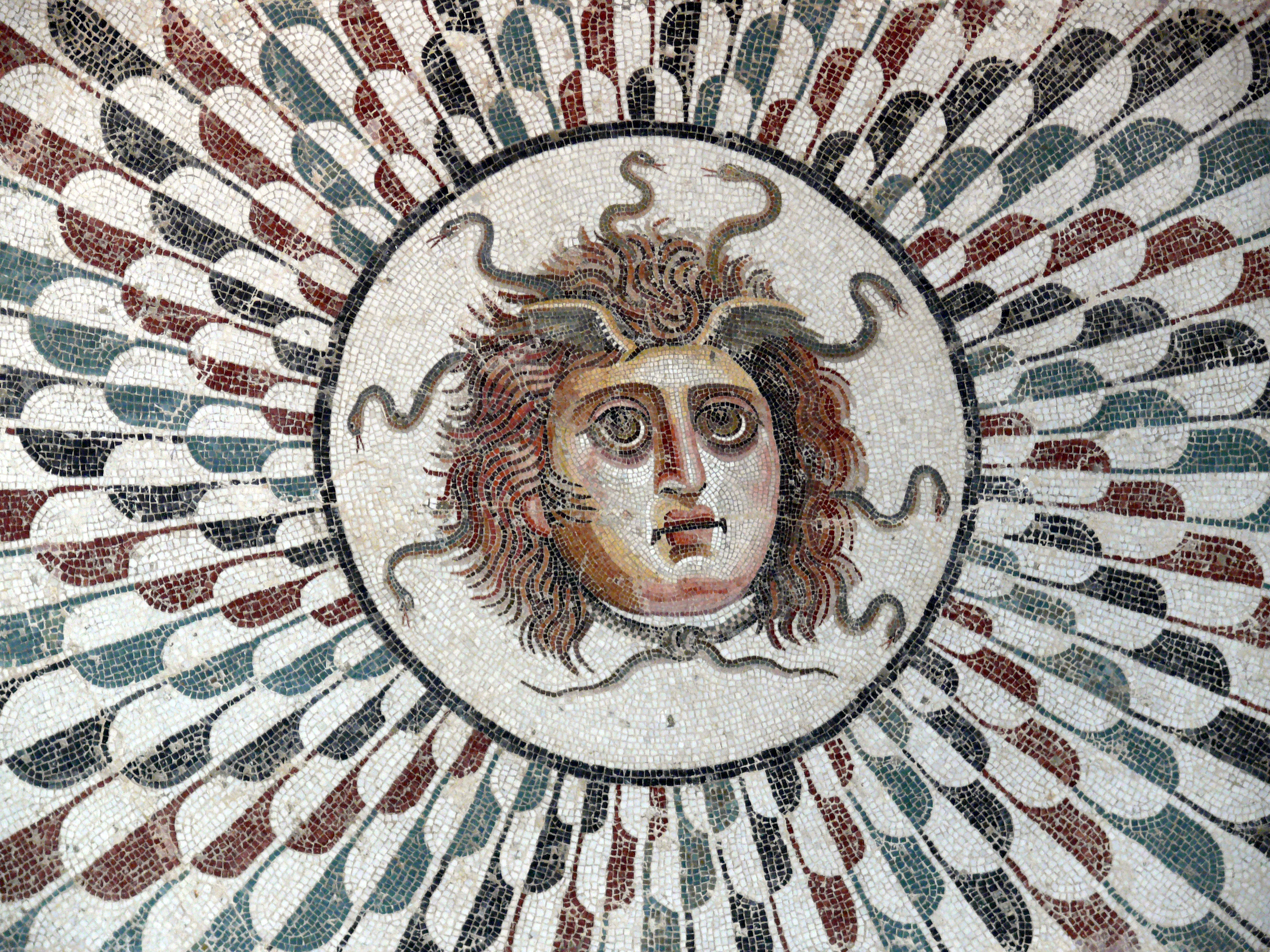
The Medusa's head central to a mosaic floor in a tepidarium of the Roman era. Museum of Sousse, Tunisia

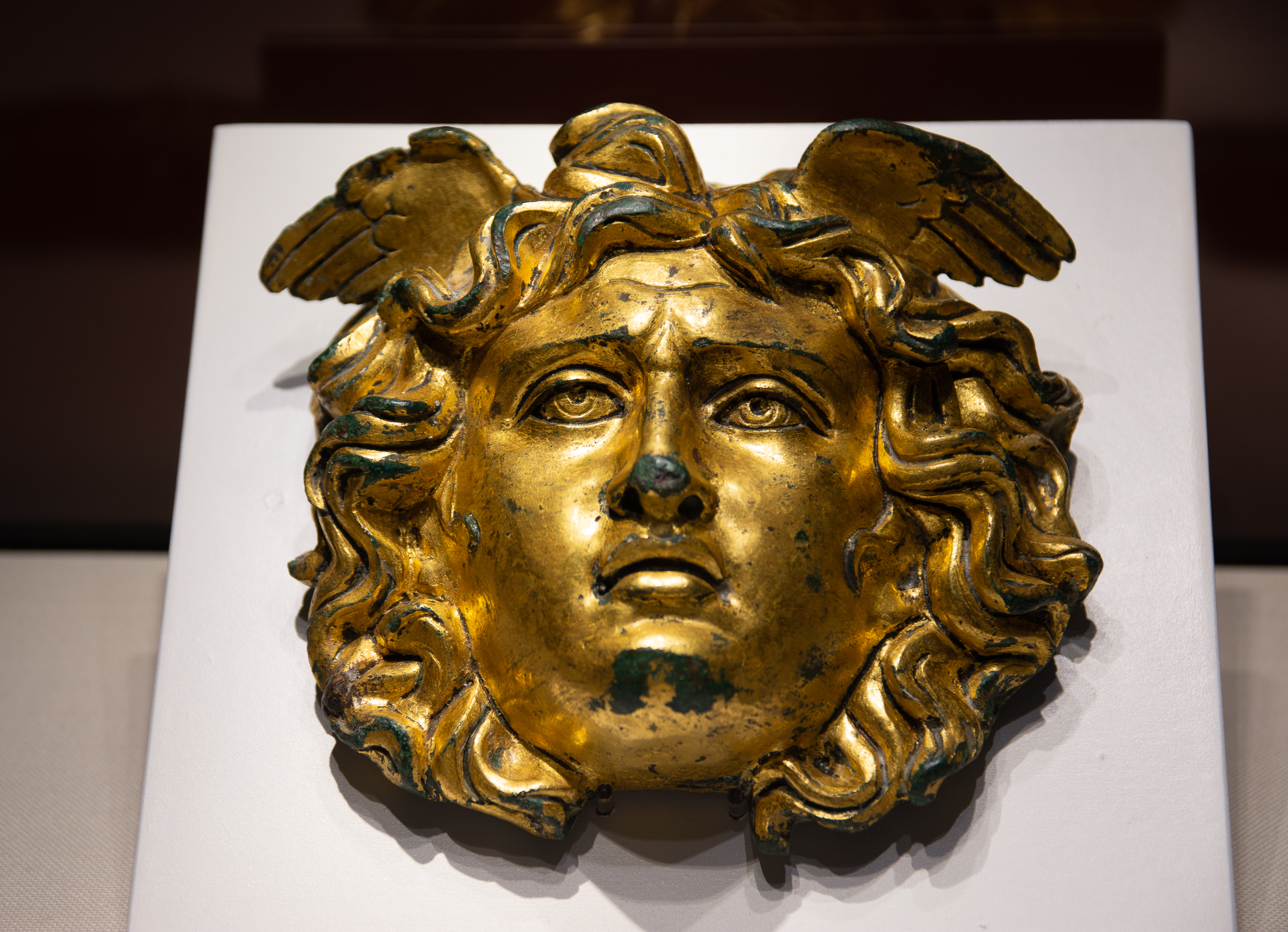
Aplique with the shape of Medusa discovered in Ulpia Traiana Sarmizegetusa

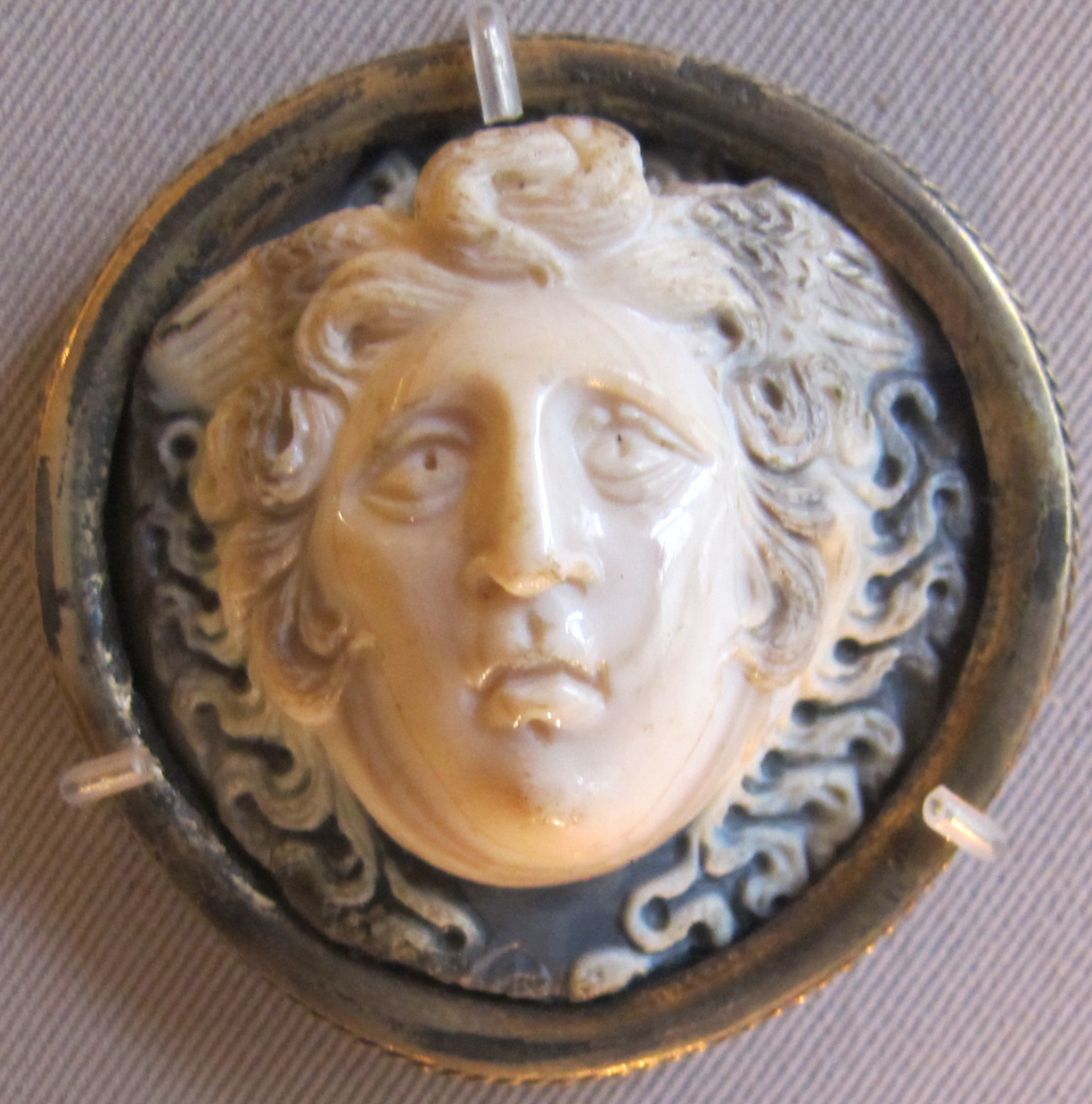
A Roman cameo of the 2nd or 3rd century

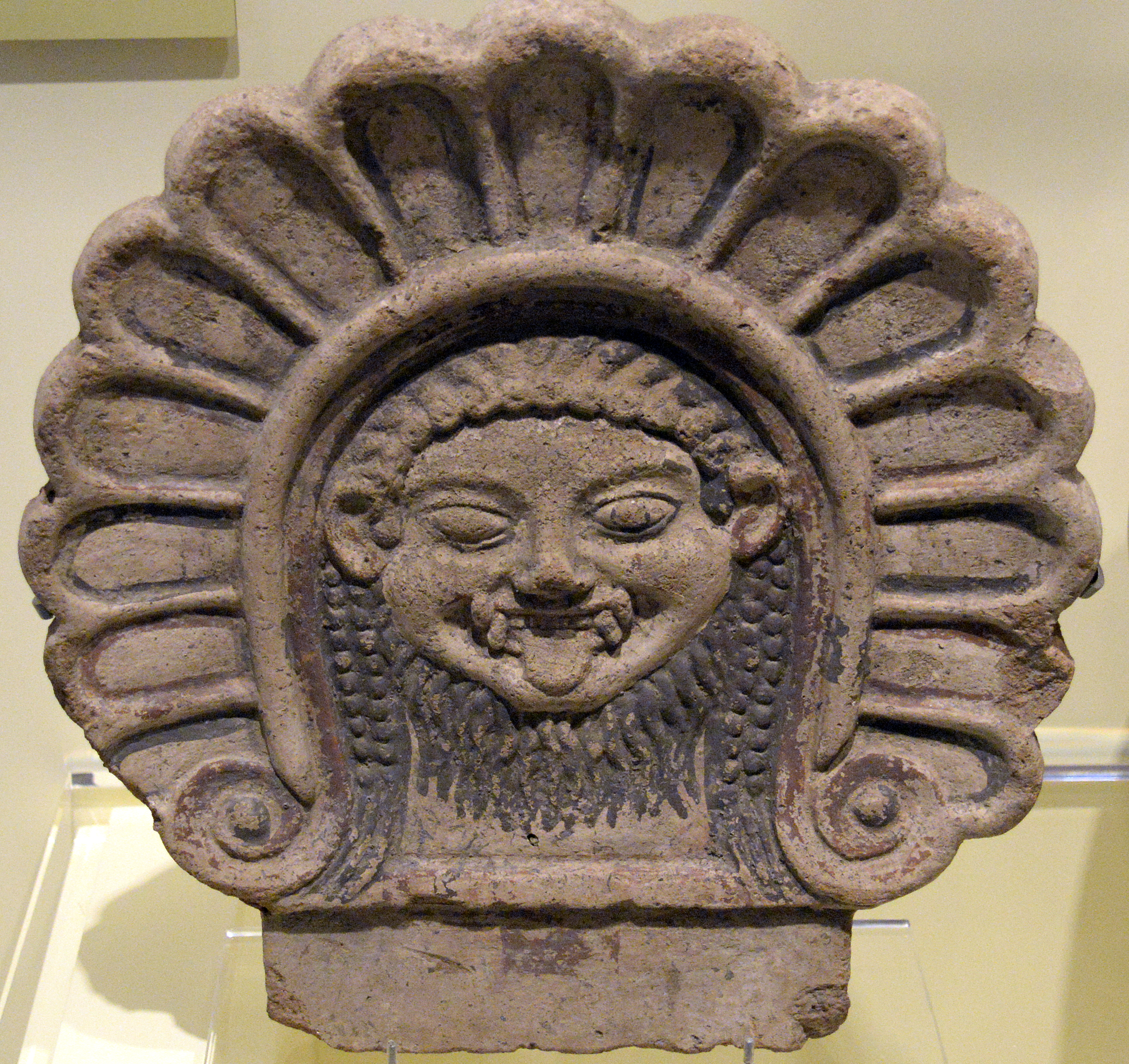
Roof ornament with Medusa's head. Etruscan, from Italy, 6th century BC. National Museum of Scotland, Edinburgh

== Modern interpretations ==
=== Historical ===
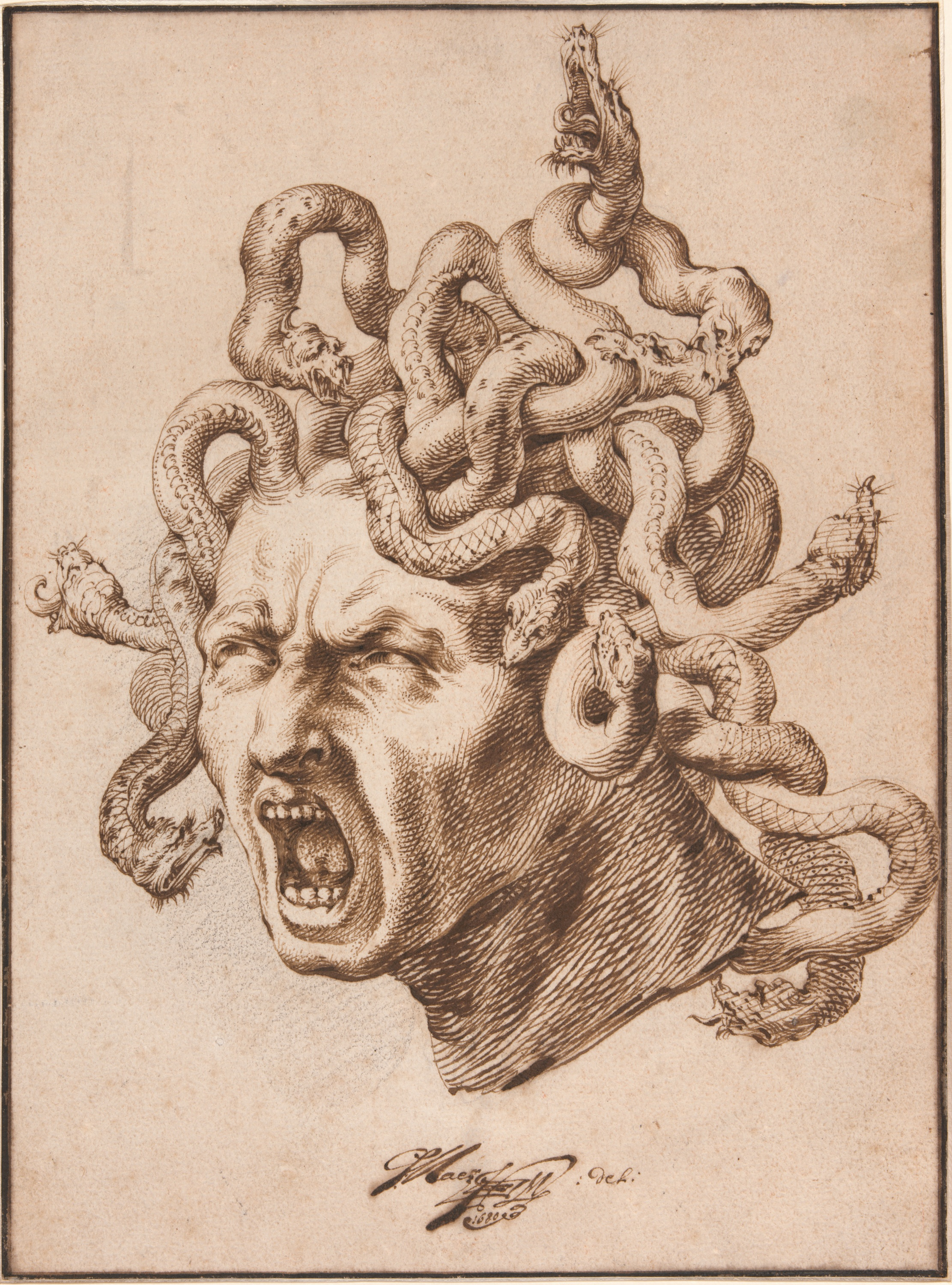
Head of Medusa by Godfried Maes, 1680

Several early classics scholars interpreted the myth of Medusa as a quasi-historical – "based on or reconstructed from an event, custom, style, etc., in the past", or "sublimated" memory of an actual invasion.

According to Joseph Campbell:

The legend of Perseus beheading Medusa means, specifically, that "the Hellenes overran the goddess's chief shrines" and "stripped her priestesses of their Gorgon masks", the latter being apotropaic faces worn to frighten away the profane. That is to say, there occurred in the early thirteenth century B.C. an actual historic rupture, a sort of sociological trauma, which has been registered in this myth, much as what Freud terms the latent content of a neurosis is registered in the manifest content of a dream: registered yet hidden, registered in the unconscious yet unknown or misconstrued by the conscious mind.

=== Psychoanalysis ===
In 1940, Sigmund Freud's "Das Medusenhaupt (Medusa's Head)" was published posthumously. In Freud's interpretation: "To decapitate = to castrate. The terror of Medusa is thus a terror of castration that is linked to the sight of something. Numerous analyses have made us familiar with the occasion for this: it occurs when a boy, who has hitherto been unwilling to believe the threat of castration, catches sight of the female genitals, probably those of an adult, surrounded by hair, and essentially those of his mother." In this perspective the "ravishingly beautiful" Medusa (see above) is the mother remembered in innocence; before the mythic truth of castration dawns on the subject. Classic Medusa, in contrast, is an Oedipal/libidinous symptom. Looking at the forbidden mother (in her hair-covered genitals, so to speak) stiffens the subject in illicit desire and freezes him in terror of the Father's retribution. There are no recorded instances of Medusa turning a woman to stone.

Archetypal literary criticism continues to find psychoanalysis useful. Beth Seelig chooses to interpret Medusa's punishment as resulting from rape rather than the common interpretation of having willingly consented in Athena's temple, as an outcome of the goddess' unresolved conflicts with her own father Zeus.

=== Feminism ===
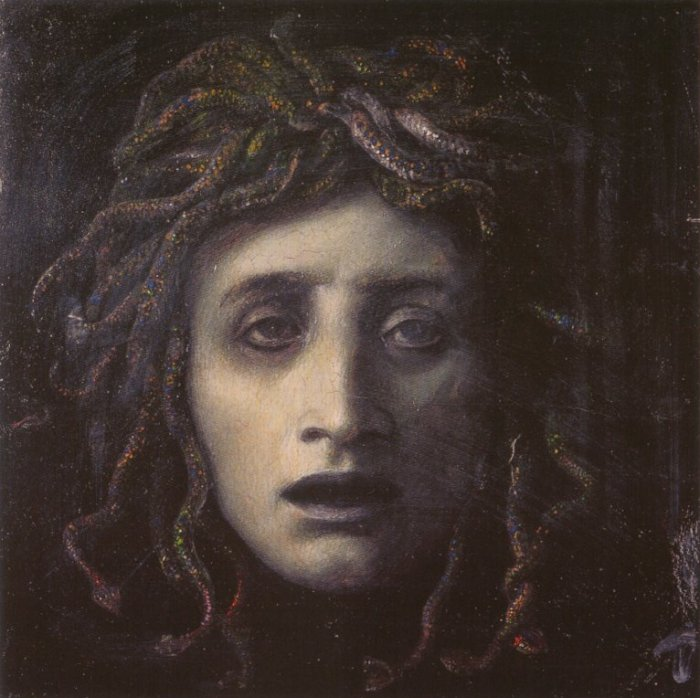
Medusa by Arnold Böcklin, c. 1878

In the 20th century, feminists reassessed Medusa's appearances in literature and in modern culture, including the use of Medusa as a logo by fashion company Versace. The name "Medusa" itself is often used in ways not directly connected to the mythological figure but to suggest the gorgon's abilities or to connote malevolence; despite her claimed origins as a beauty, the name in common usage "came to mean monster." The book Female Rage: Unlocking Its Secrets, Claiming Its Power by Mary Valentis and Anne Devane notes that "When we asked women what female rage looks like to them, it was always Medusa, the snaky-haired monster of myth, who came to mind ... In one interview after another we were told that Medusa is 'the most horrific woman in the world' ... [though] none of the women we interviewed could remember the details of the myth."

Medusa's visage has since been adopted by many women as a symbol of female rage; one of the first publications to express this idea was Women: A Journal of Liberation in their issue one, volume six for 1978. The cover featured the image of the Gorgon Medusa by Froggi Lupton, which the editors on the inside cover explained "can be a map to guide us through our terrors, through the depths of our anger into the sources of our power as women."

In issue three, Fall 1986 for the magazine Woman of Power an article called Gorgons: A Face for Contemporary Women's Rage, appeared, written by Emily Erwin Culpepper, who wrote that "The Amazon Gorgon face is female fury personified. The Gorgon/Medusa image has been rapidly adopted by large numbers of feminists who recognize her as one face of our own rage." Griselda Pollock analyses the passage from horrorism to compassion in the figure of the Medusa through Adriana Cavarero's philosophy and Bracha Ettinger's art and Matrixial theory.

Elana Dykewomon's 1976 collection of lesbian stories and poems, They Will Know Me by My Teeth, features a drawing of a Gorgon on its cover. Its purpose was to act as a guardian for female power, keeping the book solely in the hands of women. Stephen Wilk, author of Medusa: Solving the Mystery of the Gorgon, questioned Medusa's enduring status among the feminist movement. He believes that one reason for her longevity may be her role as a protector, fearsome and enraged. "Only the Gorgon has the savage, threatening appearance to serve as an immediately recognized symbol of rage and a protector of women's secrets," wrote Wilk.

Even in contemporary pop culture, Medusa has become largely synonymous with feminine rage. Through many of her iterations, Medusa pushes back against a story that seeks to place the male, Perseus, at its center, blameless and heroic. Author Sibylle Baumbach described Medusa as a "multimodal image of intoxication, petrifaction, and luring attractiveness", citing her seductive contemporary representation, as well as her dimensionality, as the reason for her longevity.

Elizabeth Johnston's November 2016 Atlantic essay called Medusa the original 'Nasty Woman.' Johnston goes on to say that as Medusa has been repeatedly compared to Hillary Clinton during the 2016 presidential election, she proves her merit as an icon, finding relevance even in modern politics. "Medusa has since haunted Western imagination, materializing whenever male authority feels threatened by female agency," writes Johnston. Beyond that, Medusa's story is, Johnston argues, a rape narrative. A story of victim blaming, one that she says sounds all too familiar in a current American context.

Medusa is widely known as a monstrous creature with snakes in her hair whose gaze turns men to stone. Through the lens of theology, film, art, and feminist literature, my students and I map how her meaning has shifted over time and across cultures. In so doing, we unravel a familiar narrative thread: In Western culture, strong women have historically been imagined as threats requiring male conquest and control, and Medusa herself has long been the go-to figure for those seeking to demonize female authority.

— Elizabeth Johnston

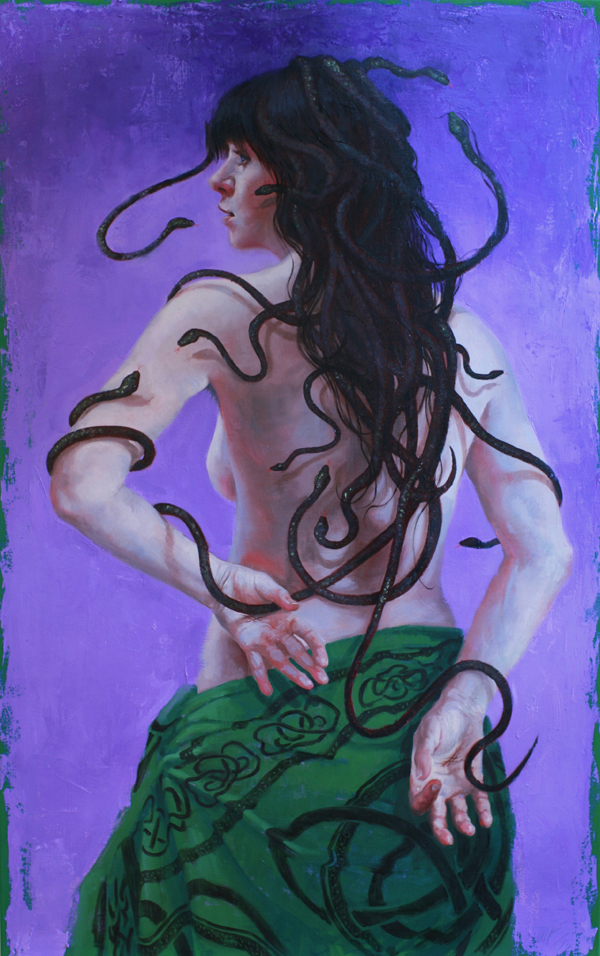
#Me(dusa)too…Two by Judy Takács, 2018

The Medusa story has also been interpreted in contemporary art as a classic case of rape-victim blaming, by the goddess Athena. Inspired by the #metoo movement, contemporary figurative artist Judy Takács returns Medusa's beauty along with a hashtag stigmata in her portrait, #Me(dusa)too.

Feminist theorist Hélène Cixous famously tackled the myth in her essay "The Laugh of the Medusa." She argues that men's retelling of the narrative turned Medusa into a monster because they feared female desire. "The Laugh of the Medusa" is largely a call to arms, urging women to reclaim their identity through writing as she rejects the patriarchal society of Western culture. Cixous calls writing "an act which will not only 'realize' the decensored relation of woman to her sexuality, to her womanly being, giving her access to her native strength; it will give her back her goods, her pleasures, her organs, her immense bodily territories which have been kept under seal." She claims "we must kill the false woman who is preventing the live one from breathing. Inscribe the breath of the whole woman." Cixous wants to destroy the phallogocentric system, and to empower women's bodies and language. "You only have to look at the Medusa straight on to see her," writes Cixous. "And she's not deadly. She's beautiful and she's laughing."

=== Nihilism ===
Medusa has sometimes appeared as representing notions of scientific determinism and nihilism, especially in contrast with romantic idealism. In this interpretation of Medusa, attempts to avoid looking into her eyes represent avoiding the ostensibly depressing reality that the universe is meaningless. Jack London uses Medusa in this way in his novel The Mutiny of the Elsinore:

I cannot help remembering a remark of De Casseres. It was over the wine in Mouquin's. Said he: "The profoundest instinct in man is to war against the truth; that is, against the Real. He shuns facts from his infancy. His life is a perpetual evasion. Miracle, chimera and to-morrow keep him alive. He lives on fiction and myth. It is the Lie that makes him free. Animals alone are given the privilege of lifting the veil of Isis; men dare not. The animal, awake, has no fictional escape from the Real because he has no imagination. Man, awake, is compelled to seek a perpetual escape into Hope, Belief, Fable, Art, God, Socialism, Immortality, Alcohol, Love. From Medusa-Truth he makes an appeal to Maya-Lie."

— Jack London, The Mutiny of the Elsinore

== Art ==
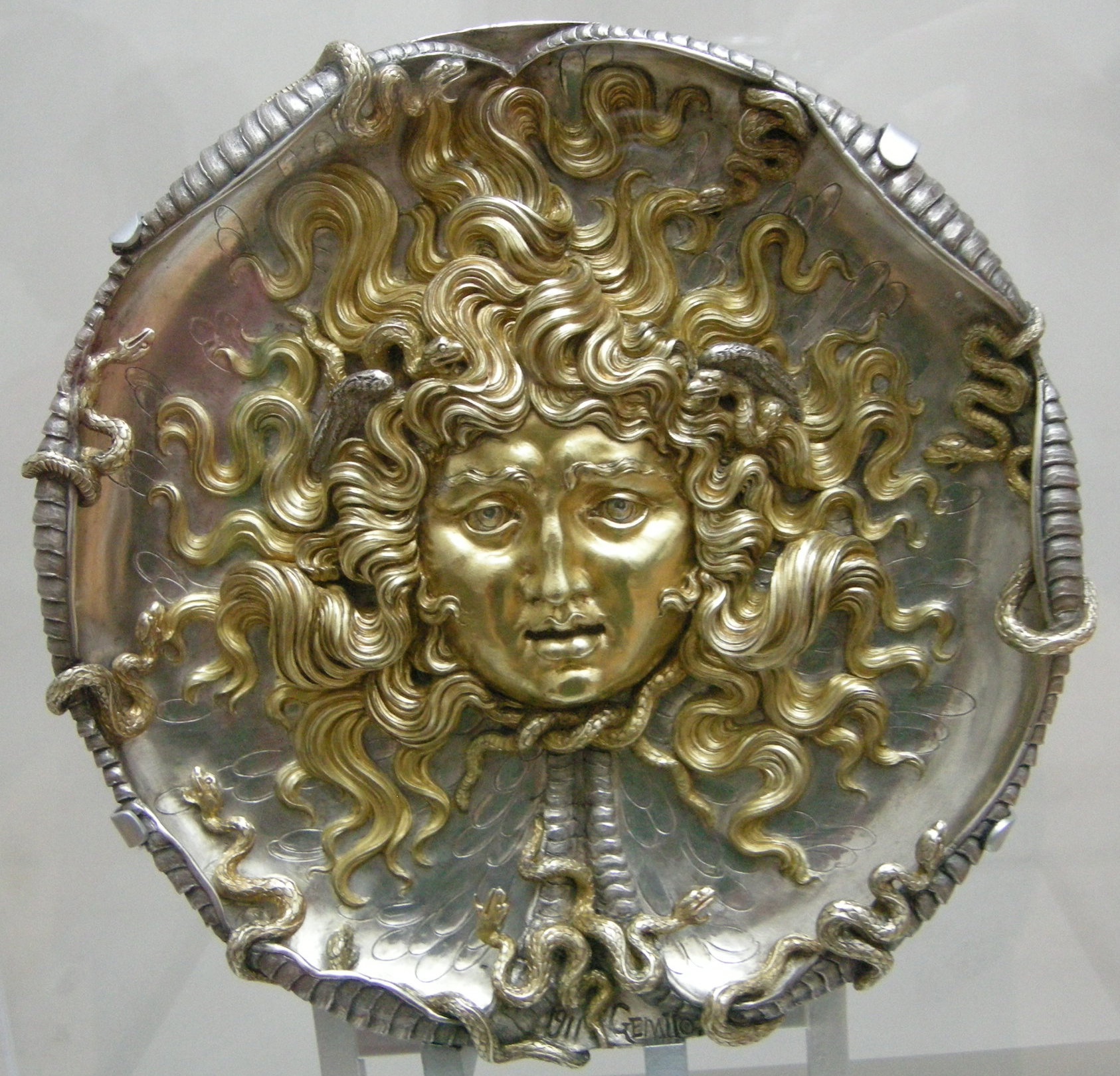
An embossed plaque in the Art Nouveau style from 1911

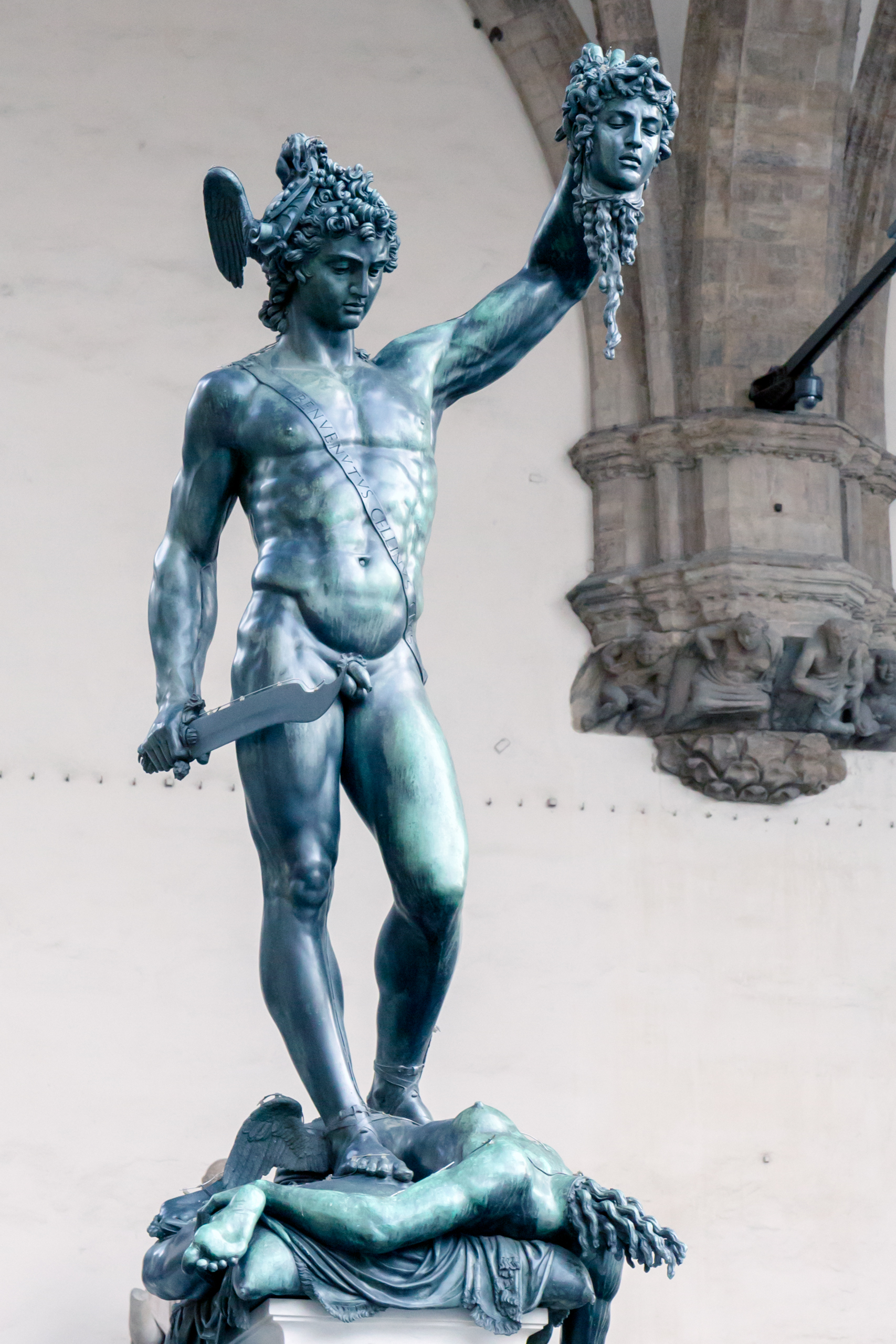
Perseus with the Head of Medusa (1554), Benvenuto Cellini

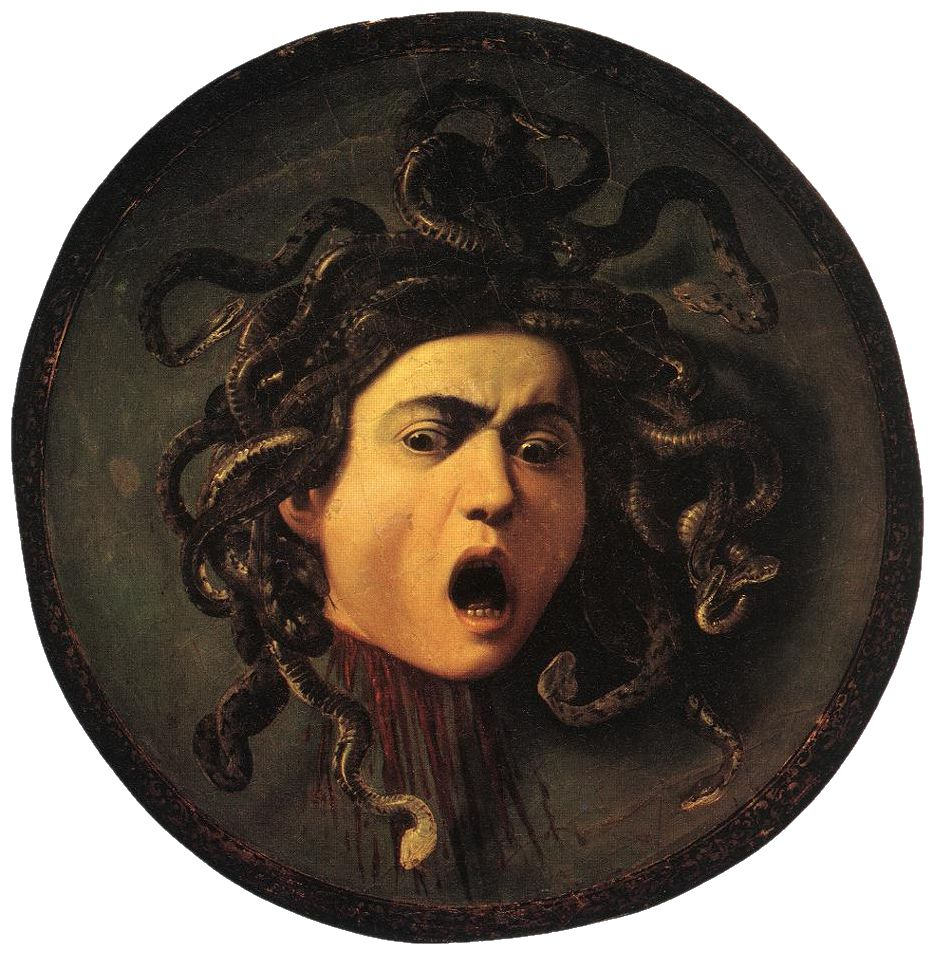
Medusa (c. 1597), by Caravaggio

Medusa has been depicted in several works of art, including:

- Perseus beheading the sleeping Medusa, obverse of a terracotta pelike (jar) attributed to Polygnotos (vase painter) (c. 450–440 BC), collection of the Metropolitan Museum of Art
- Medusa on the breastplate of Alexander the Great, as depicted in the Alexander Mosaic from Pompeii's House of the Faun (c. 200 BC)
- Medusa column bases of Basilica Cistern in Constantinople.
- The "Rondanini Medusa", a Roman copy of the Gorgoneion on the aegis of Athena; later used as a model for the Gorgon's head in Antonio Canova's marble Perseus with the Head of Medusa (1798–1801)
- Medusa (oil on canvas) by Leonardo da Vinci
- Perseus with the Head of Medusa (bronze sculpture) by Benvenuto Cellini (1554)
- Perseus and Medusa – bronze statue by Hubert Gerhard (c. 1590)
- Medusa (oil on canvas) by Caravaggio (1597)
- Head of Medusa, by Peter Paul Rubens (1618)
- Medusa (marble bust) by Gianlorenzo Bernini (1630s)
- Medusa is played by a countertenor in Jean-Baptiste Lully and Philippe Quinault's opera, Persée (1682). She sings the aria "J'ay perdu la beauté qui me rendit si vaine" ("I have lost the beauty that made me so vain").
- Perseus Turning Phineus and his Followers to Stone (oil on canvas) by Luca Giordano (early 1680s).
- Perseus with the Head of Medusa (marble sculpture) by Antonio Canova (1801)
- Medusa (1854), marble sculpture by Harriet Hosmer, collection of the Detroit Institute of Art
- Medusa (oil on canvas) by Arnold Böcklin (c. 1878)
- Perseus (bronze sculpture) by Salvador Dalí
- Medusa sculpture by Luciano Garbati, which portrays her clutching the severed head of Perseus (2008)

Medusa remained a common theme in art in the nineteenth century, when her myth was retold in Thomas Bulfinch's Mythology. Edward Burne-Jones' Perseus Cycle of paintings and a drawing by Aubrey Beardsley gave way to the twentieth-century works of Paul Klee, John Singer Sargent, Pablo Picasso, Pierre et Gilles, and Auguste Rodin's bronze sculpture The Gates of Hell.

=== Flags and emblems ===
The head of Medusa is featured on some regional symbols. One example is that of the flag and emblem of Sicily, together with the three-legged trinacria. The inclusion of Medusa in the center implies the protection of the goddess Athena, who wore the Gorgon's likeness on her aegis, as said above. Another example is the coat of arms of Dohalice village in the Czech Republic.

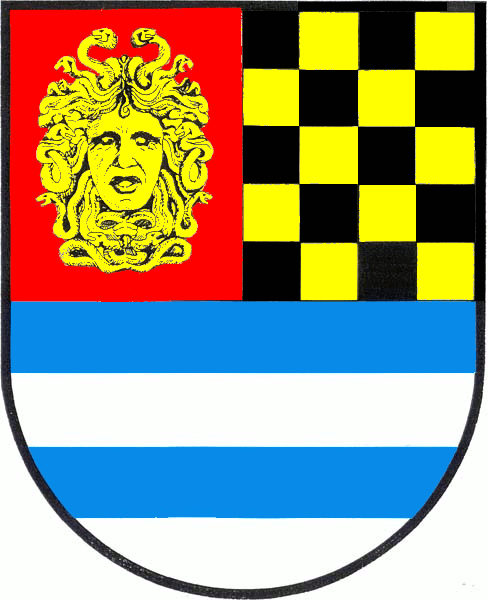
Municipal coat of arms of Dohalice village, Hradec Králové District, Czech Republic

Flag of Sicily

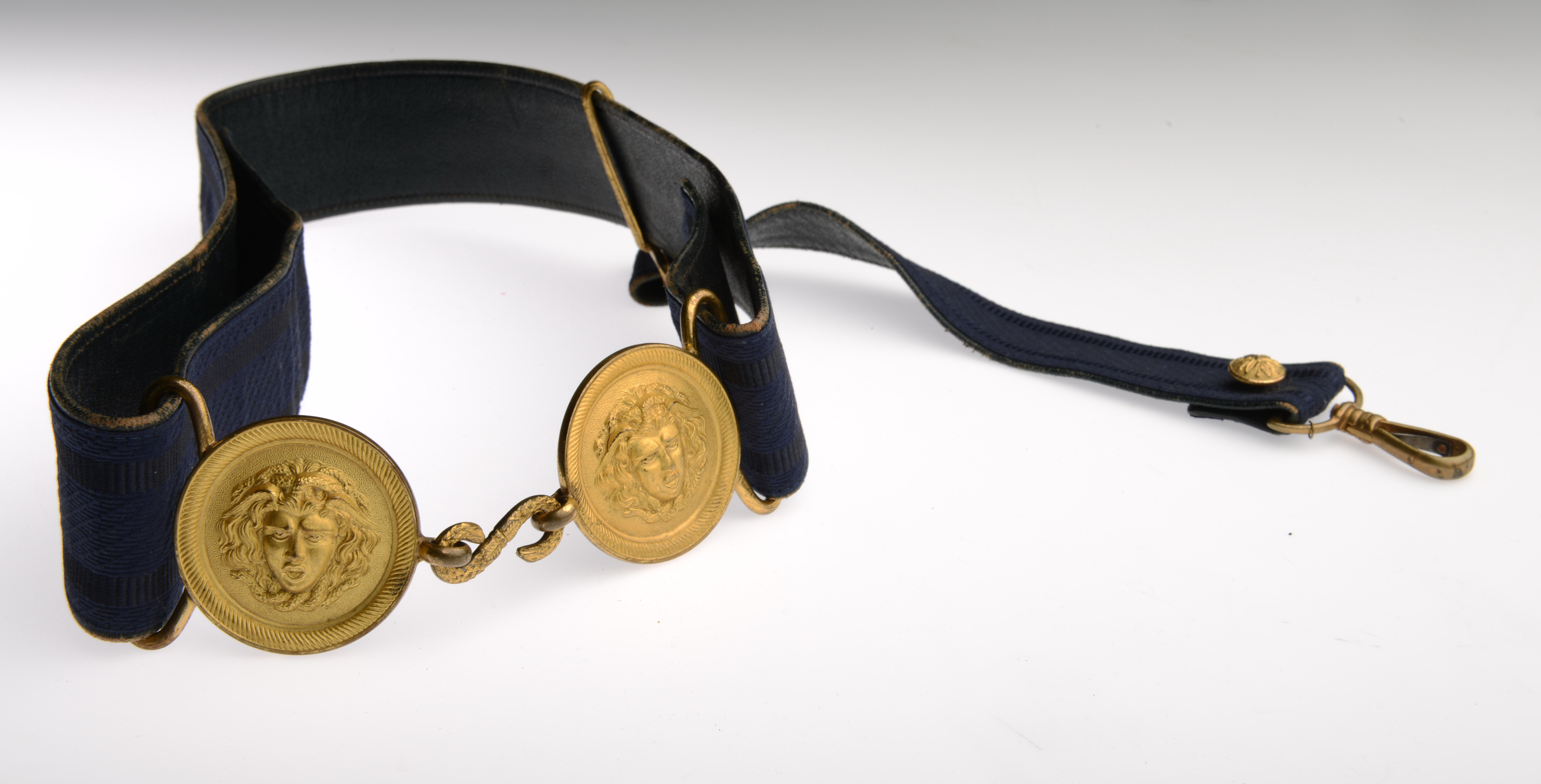
Ceremonial French military uniform belt of World War I

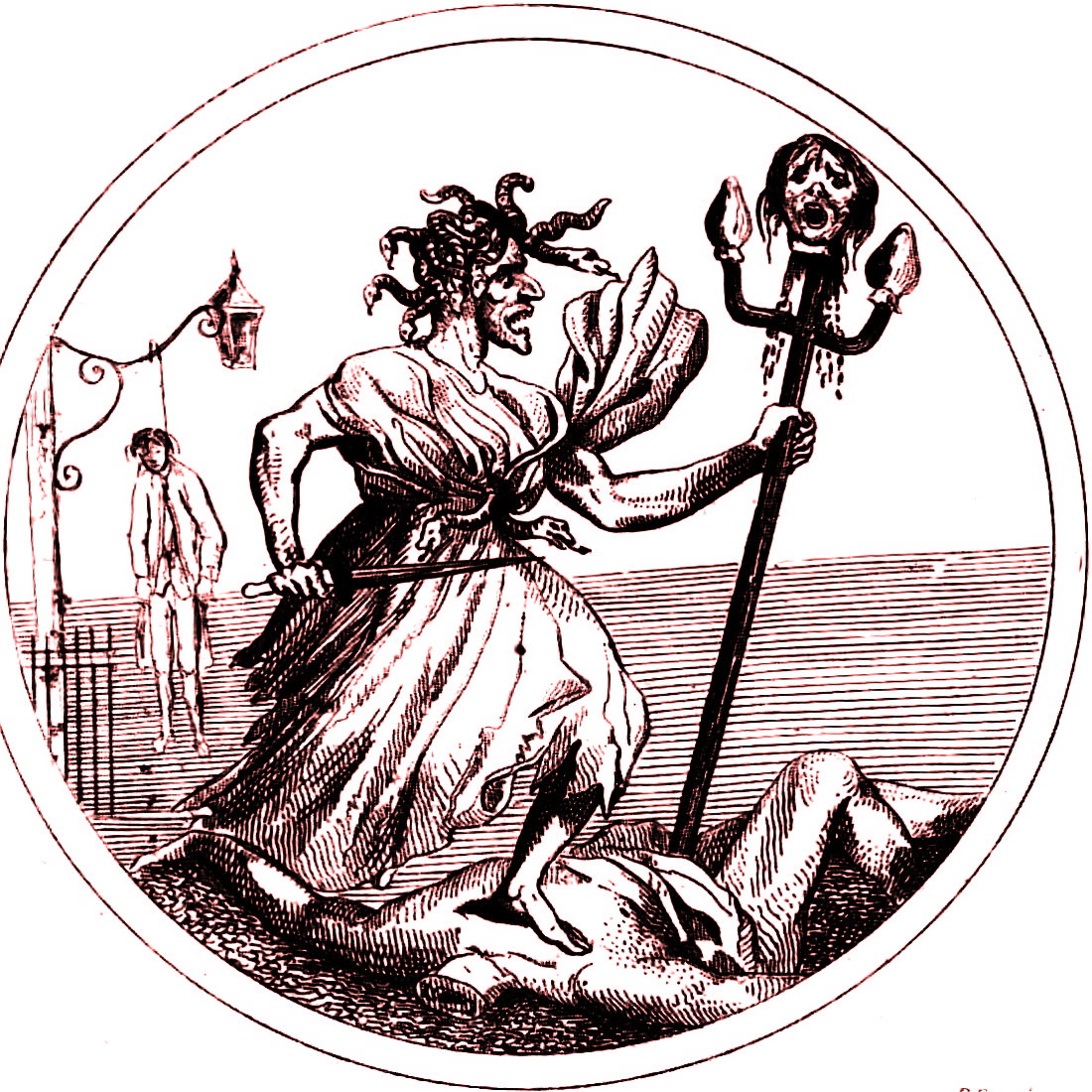
Medusa image in a historical caricature of the Reign of Terror during the French Revolution

== Science ==
Medusa is honored in the following scientific names:

- Acanthemblemaria medusa Smith-Vaniz & Palacio 1974
- Apodochondria medusae Ho & Dojiri 1988
- Archimonocelis medusa Curini-Galletti & Cannon 1997
- Atractus medusa Passos et al. 2009
- Australomedusa Russell 1970
- Boeromedusa Bouillon 1995
- Bothrops medusa Sternfeld 1920
- Cardiodectes medusaeus Wilson C.B. 1908
- Chama oomedusae Matsukuma 1996
- Cirratulus medusa Johnston 1833
- Coronamedusae
- Csiromedusa Gershwin & Zeidler 2010
- Csiromedusa medeopolis Gershwin & Zeidler 2010
- Discomedusa lobata Claus 1877
- Discomedusae
- Eustomias medusa Gibbs, Clarke & Gomon 1983
- Gorgonocephalus caputmedusae L. 1758
- Gyrocotyle medusarum von Linstow 1903 (taxon inquirendum)
- Halimedusa Bigelow 1916
- Halimedusa typus Bigelow 1916
- Heteronema medusae Skvortzov 1957
- Hoplopleon medusarum K.H. Barnard 1932
- Hyperia medusarum Müller 1776
- Hyperoche medusarum Krøyer 1838
- Leptogorgia medusa Bayer 1952
- Lilyopsis medusa Metschnikoff & Metschnikoff 1871
- Limnomedusae
- Loimia medusa Savigny in Lamarck 1818
- Loimia medusa angustescutata Willey 1905
- Lulworthia medusa (Ellis & Everh.) Cribb & J.W. Cribb 1955
- Lulworthia medusa var. biscaynia Meyers 1957
- Lulworthia medusa var. medusa (Ellis & Everh.) Cribb & J.W. Cribb 1955
- Magnippe caputmedusae Stock 1978
- Medusa Loureiro 1790
- Medusablennius Springer 1966
- Medusaceratops Ryan, Russell & Hartman 2010
- Medusafissurella McLean & Kilburn 1986
- Medusafissurella chemnitzii G. B. Sowerby I 1835
- Medusafissurella dubia Reeve 1849
- Medusafissurella melvilli G. B. Sowerby III 1882
- Medusafissurella salebrosa Reeve 1850
- Mesacanthoides caputmedusae (Ditlevsen 1918) Wieser 1959
- Myxaster medusa Fisher 1913
- Narcomedusae
- Ophioplinthus medusa Lyman 1878
- Phallomedusa Golding, Ponder & Byrne 2007
- Phallomedusa austrina Golding, Ponder & Byrne 2007
- Phallomedusa solida Martens 1878
- Phascolion medusae Cutler & Cutler 1980
- Philomedusa
- Philomedusa vogtii Müller 1860
- Polycirrus medusa Grube 1850
- Polycirrus medusa sakhalinensis Buzhinskaja 1988
- Sarcomella medusa Schmidt 1868
- Stauromedusae
- Stellamedusa Raskoff & Matsumoto 2004
- Stellamedusa ventana Raskoff & Matsumoto 2004
- Stygiomedusa Russell 1959
- Stygiomedusa gigantea Browne 1910
- Thylacodes medusae Pilsbry 1891
- Trachymedusae

== Myth sources ==
=== Primary myth sources ===
Greek:

- Hesiod, Theogony, 270 (text)
- Apollodorus, The Library, book II, part iv, no. 2-3 (text)
- Aeschylus, Prometheus Bound, 790–801 (text)

Roman:

- Ovid, Metamorphoses iv. 774–785, 790–801 (text)

=== Mentioned in ===
Greek:

- Homer, The Iliad, Book 5, line 741 (text); book 8, line 348 (text); book 11, line 36 (text)
- Homer, The Odyssey, Book 11, line 635 (text)
- Euripides, Ion, lines 1003–1023 (text)
- Apollonius Rhodius, Argonautica, book 4, line 1515 (text)

Roman:

- Publius "Virgil" Maro, Aeneid vi.289 (text)
- Lucan, The Civil War, book ix.624–684 (text)
- Valerius Flaccus, Argonautica

== See also ==
- Apotropaic symbols – Symbols used in Apotropaic magic
- Caput Medusae - [Head of Medusa] (disambiguation article)
- Cassandra – Mythological prophetess and princess of Troy
- Comaetho – Priestess in Greek legend
- Humbaba – Character in Gilgamesh myths
- Medea – Daughter of King Aeëtes of Colchis in Greek mythology
- Medusa complex – Psychological complex: emotionally frozen
- Nāga – Mythological creatures in Indian religions
- Shahmaran – Mythical creature in West and Central Asian cultures
- Theodontius – Author of a Latin work on mythology
- Tiamat – Primordial goddess of ancient Babylon religion

== Sources ==
- Apollodorus, Apollodorus, The Library, with an English Translation by Sir James George Frazer, F.B.A., F.R.S. in 2 Volumes, Cambridge, Massachusetts, Harvard University Press; London, William Heinemann Ltd., 1921. ISBN 0-674-99135-4. Online version at the Perseus Digital Library.
- Brill's New Pauly: Encyclopaedia of the Ancient World. Antiquity, Volume 5, Equ-Has, editors: Hubert Cancik, Helmuth Schneider, Brill, 2004. ISBN 978-90-04-12268-0. Online version at Brill.
- Gantz, Timothy, Early Greek Myth: A Guide to Literary and Artistic Sources, Johns Hopkins University Press, 1996, Two volumes: ISBN 978-0-8018-5360-9 (Vol. 1), ISBN 978-0-8018-5362-3 (Vol. 2).
- Garber, Marjorie; Vickers, Nancy (2003). The Medusa Reader. Routledge. ISBN 978-0-415-90099-7.
- Grimal, Pierre, The Dictionary of Classical Mythology, Wiley-Blackwell, 1996. ISBN 978-0-631-20102-1.
- Hard, Robin (2004). The Routledge Handbook of Greek Mythology: Based on H.J. Rose's "Handbook of Greek Mythology". Psychology Press. ISBN 978-0-415-18636-0.
- Harrison, Jane Ellen (1903) 3rd ed. 1922. Prolegomena to the Study of Greek Religion,: "The Ker as Gorgon"
- Hesiod, Theogony, in The Homeric Hymns and Homerica with an English Translation by Hugh G. Evelyn-White, Cambridge, Massachusetts, Harvard University Press; London, William Heinemann Ltd., 1914. Online version at the Perseus Digital Library.
- Hyginus, Gaius Julius, Fabulae, in The Myths of Hyginus, edited and translated by Mary A. Grant, Lawrence: University of Kansas Press, 1960. Online version at ToposText.
- Karoglou, Kiki (February 1, 2018). Dangerous Beauty: Medusa in Classical Art: The Metropolitan Museum of Art Bulletin. Vol. 75. New York, USA: Metropolitan Museum of Art. ISBN 978-1-58839-642-6.
- Ovid, Metamorphoses, Brookes More, Boston, Cornhill Publishing Co. 1922. Online version at the Perseus Digital Library.
- Ovid. Metamorphoses, Volume I: Books 1–8. Translated by Frank Justus Miller. Revised by G. P. Goold. Loeb Classical Library No. 42. Cambridge, Massachusetts: Harvard University Press, 1977, first published 1916. ISBN 978-0-674-99046-3. Online version at Harvard University Press.
- Seelig BJ. The rape of Medusa in the temple of Athena: aspects of triangulation in the girl. Int J Psychoanal. 2002 Aug;83(Pt 4):895–911. doi: 10.1516/00207570260172975. PMID 12204171.
- Tripp, Edward, Crowell's Handbook of Classical Mythology, Thomas Y. Crowell Co; First edition (June 1970). ISBN 069022608X.
- Walker, Barbara G. (1996). The Women's Encyclopedia of Myths & Secrets. New Jersey: Castle Books. ISBN 0785807209
- Wilk, Stephen (2000). Medusa: Solving the Mystery of the Gorgon. New York: Oxford University Press. ISBN 9780195124316.
