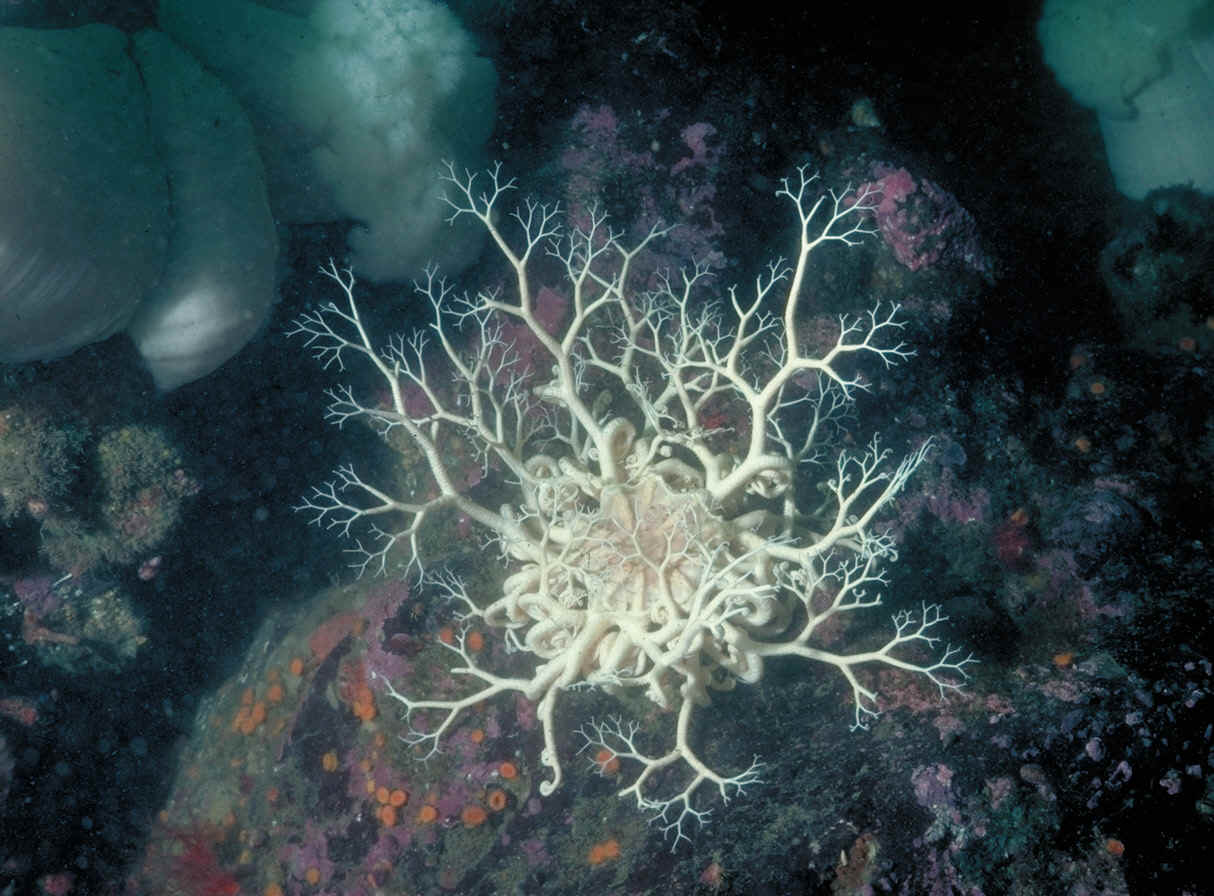
- Gorgonocephalus eucnemis

Scientific classification
- Kingdom: Animalia
- Phylum: Echinodermata
- Class: Ophiuroidea
- Order: Phrynophiurida
- Family: Gorgonocephalidae
- Subfamily: Gorgonocephalinae
- Genus: Gorgonocephalus; Leach, 1815

Species
- 11 species (see text)

= Gorgonocephalus =

Genus of brittle stars

Gorgonocephalus, the Gorgon's heads or Gorgon's head basket stars, is a genus of marine basket stars in the class Ophiuroidea. Members of this genus are found in coldwater environments including the Arctic, the Antarctic, and deep-sea habitats. The scientific name comes from the Greek, gorgós meaning "dreaded" and -cephalus meaning "head", and refers to the similarity between these echinoids and the Gorgon's head from Greek myth with its coiled serpents for hair.

== Description ==
Members of this genus have a central disc with five arms which repeatedly bifurcate, dichotomously branching into smaller and smaller subdivisions. They have an endoskeleton of calcified ossicles as do other ophiuroids, but in their case, it is covered by a fleshy layer of skin, giving them a rubbery appearance. To feed, a basket star perches in an elevated position such as on a sponge, and extend its arms in a basket-like fashion. The branches and branchlets twist and coil and may ensnare small crustaceans that come within reach such as the northern krill (Meganyctiphanes norvegica). The arms are covered in tiny hooks and spines which hold the prey. Along with the tube feet, these convey it to the mouth, which is on the underside of the central disc.

== Species ==
These species are included in the genus by the World Register of Marine Species:

- Gorgonocephalus arcticus Leach, 1819
- Gorgonocephalus caputmedusae (Linnaeus, 1758) – Medusa's head
- Gorgonocephalus chilensis (Philippi, 1858)
- Gorgonocephalus diomedeae Lütken & Mortensen, 1899
- Gorgonocephalus dolichodactylus Döderlein, 1911
- Gorgonocephalus eucnemis (Müller & Troschel, 1842)
- Gorgonocephalus lamarckii (Müller & Troschel, 1842)
- Gorgonocephalus pectinatus Mortensen, 1933
- Gorgonocephalus pustulatum (H.L. Clark, 1916)
- Gorgonocephalus sundanus Döderlein, 1927
- Gorgonocephalus tuberosus Döderlein, 1902
