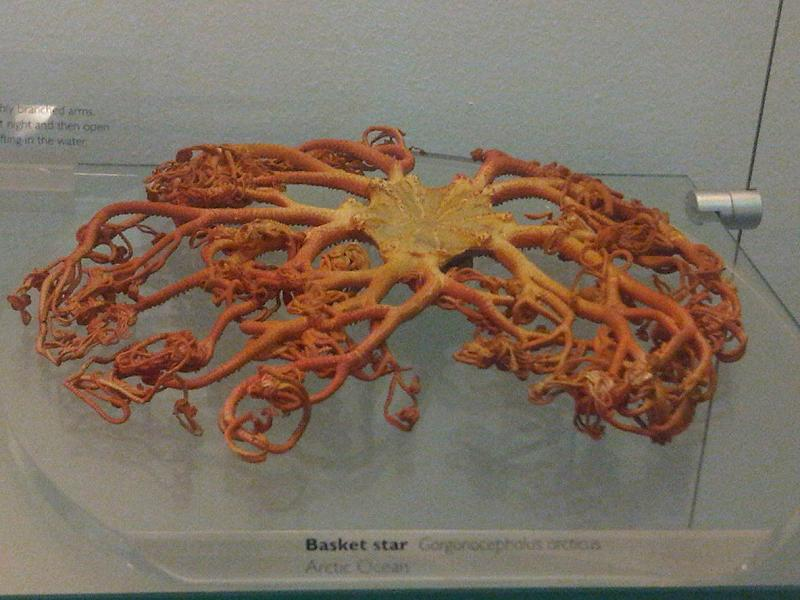

Scientific classification
- Kingdom: Animalia
- Phylum: Echinodermata
- Class: Ophiuroidea
- Order: Phrynophiurida
- Family: Gorgonocephalidae
- Genus: Gorgonocephalus
- Species: G. arcticus

Binomial name
- Gorgonocephalus arcticus Leach, 1819

Synonyms
- Astrophyton agassizi Stimpson, 1854; Gorgonocephalus agassizi (Stimpson, 1854)

= Gorgonocephalus arcticus =

Species of brittle star

Gorgonocephalus arcticus is a species of basket star in the class Ophiuroidea. The genus name comes from the Greek, gorgós meaning "dreaded" and cephalus meaning "head", and refers to the similarity between these echinoids and the Gorgon's head from Greek myth with its coiled serpents for hair.

Five Gorgonocephalus species were discovered from European waters, specifically four occurred in Scandinavian waters. The first was found at 300 m depth in the Skagerrak by Mortensen. Technological advances have made it possible for scientists to view the basket starr in situ via remotely operated vehicles (ROVs). Additional lab research has been possible from ROVs.

Gorgonocephalus arcticus populations are distributed from the Arctic to Cape Cod, Massachusetts. Basket stars move along the bottom of the ocean, and G. arcticus commonly lives in areas of moderate to strong current flow. This species is also able to live non parasitically on the exterior of other sessile animals while it continues to grow. G. arcticus have been observed living on the exterior of Boltenia ovifera, a species of tunicates found in a similar range of the Arctic to Cape Cod. This species is found in varying depths in the water column, from as shallow as the sublittoral zone to a maximum depth of 1500 m. Their feeding mechanism has been extensively studied in the wild and in captivity.

== Morphology ==
Gorgonocephalus arcticus can grows up to 400 mm in total diameter. Roughly 9.5 percent of their skeletons are composed of magnesium carbonate. Like other members of the Echinoderm taxa, five arms extending from a central disc. The arms branch off into smaller and smaller subdivisions. The calcified ossicle endoskeleton of calcified is covered by a fleshy skin, which gives them a rubbery appearance.

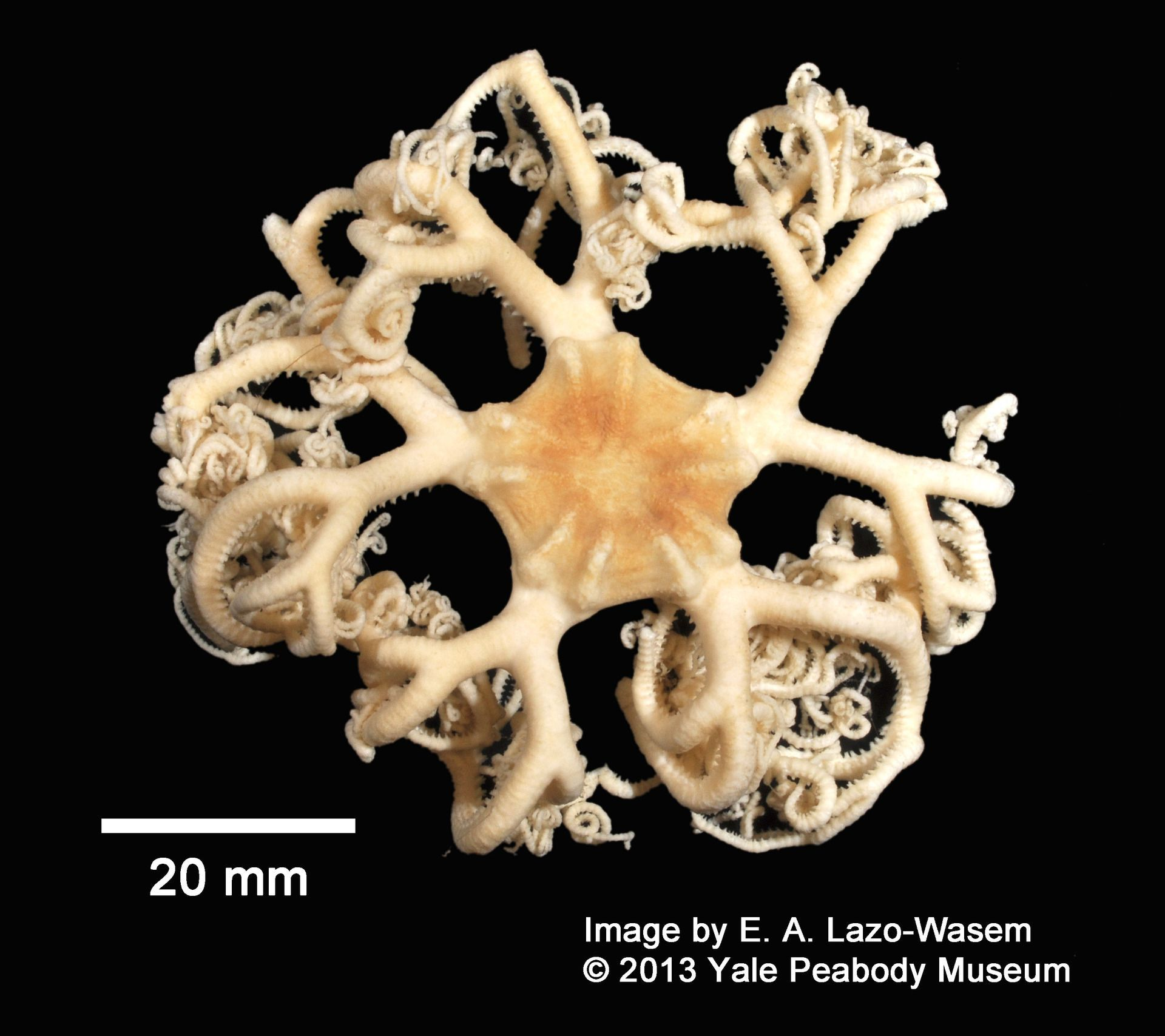
Close up of the disk of G. arcticus

Gorgonocephalus arcticus has an average disc diameter of 6.5 cm with a pentagonal outline. This disc is usually a yellowish color, with highly branched and divided arms. They can react to water-borne chemicals, changing lighting, currents and vibrations or physical contact.

Gorgonocephalus arcticus have long slender arms that are sharply separated from their disc. They usually have five arms but some have as many as 20. The basket stars are the largest ophiuroids measuring up to 27.5 inches in arm length. The branching of arms is repeated in the formation of smaller and smaller units.

The upper surface of the disc is covered with a series of scales. The mouth on the lower surface of the disc is framed by five jaws bearing spinelink teeth and papillae. The mouth leads to the saclike stomach, ending in a blind pouch. G. arcticus lacks intestines and an anus.

The oral side of the disc contains bursal slits on each side of the base of each arm. The slits are openings for respiratory bursae. These bursae are specialized sacs in the body wall that serve for gas exchange.

Gorgonocephalus arcticus move by strong arm strokes that lift the disk and thrust them forward. Basket stars crawl or cling by using their flexible articulated arm. Their skeletal arrangement of arms helps with lateral movement but they lack any flexibility. Their locomotion involves the entire arm, and the movement is made possible by their internal skeleton that supports their arms.

== Feeding ==
Gorgonocephalus arcticus is a suspension feeder and feeds by extending its arms vertically into the water column in search of food. G. arcticus feed on planktonic organisms such as zooplankton and micronekton. Unlike other observed basket stars that only feed at night, G. arcticus was observed feeding by day. This act of actively extending their arms into the water column does not make them passive consumers of plankton; they also are able to actively trap prey. Gorgonocephalus arcticus is associated with dwelling on hard substrates and create islands of similar hard substrate fauna when surrounded by unsuitable sandy substrates such as in the Fiords surrounding Baffin Island in Canada. For larger particles, G. arcticus stars wave the tips of their outstretched arms to catch plankton in the current by entangling them in rings of hooks that encircle the arms. Once the arms come into contact with these larger plankton, they curled inwards to further ensnare the prey.

The direct response to the stimulus of a prey item is for the coiling of the arm that come into contact with the prey while other nearby tendrils curve towards this arm to further trap the prey. The upper extensions of the arms are more flexible than the lower parts of the extremities so they are more effective at ensnaring prey. Basket stars like all other echinoderms have tube feet; however the tube feet did not seem to be involved in removing large plankton from the water for they only extend a short distance, approximately 1 mm, into the water column. Tube feet along with girdle hooks and spines are used to move the captured particles towards the oral surface. The girdle hooks are made of calcite and in reality are curved ossicles attached by ligaments to a boss suggesting that they are spines adapted to restrain prey items. The entire length of the arm is covered in lateral spines that increase in size and number from the tip towards the base. The spines are connected to ossicles by tendons. Though there is no muscle tissue connected to the ligaments connecting the spines and girdle hooks their main purpose is hypothesized to help contain prey as the arm coils into a curl to bring the prey to the mouth.

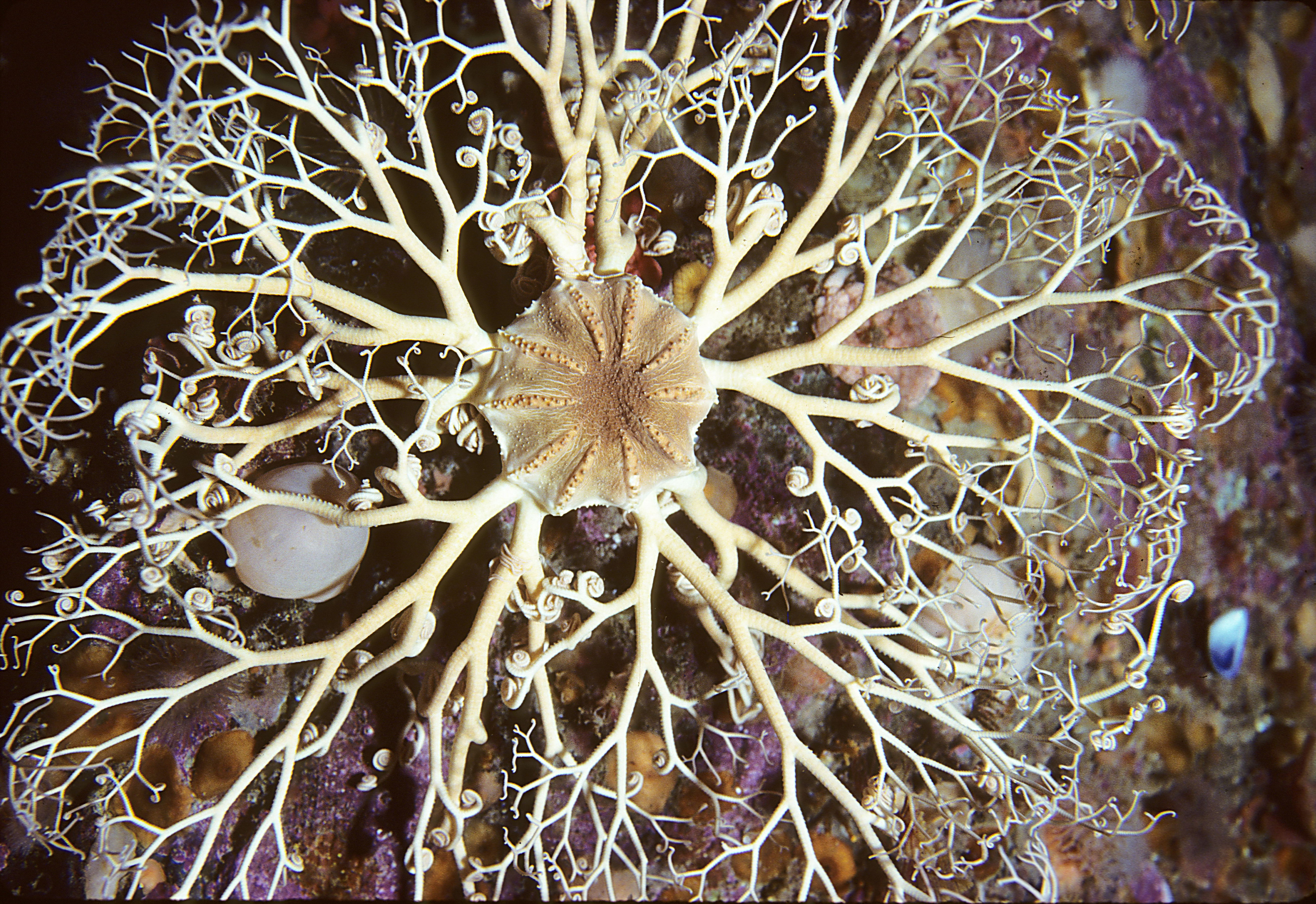
Gorgonocephalus arcticus off St Francis, Newfoundland, Canada.

== Ecology ==
Basket stars can be found anywhere from the Arctic to Cape Cod. They live on a variety of bottoms from sub-tidal to more than 1200m.

Basket stars are found in all marine habitats. They are usually found on muddy or sea bottoms as well as on hard substrates. They can tolerate low levels of salt concentration in the water.

== Reproduction ==
Basket stars possess separate sexes. Their larva has a free-swimming stage. Gametes are released into the bursae and expelled through the slit.
