= Gaspare Murtola =

Italian poet and writer

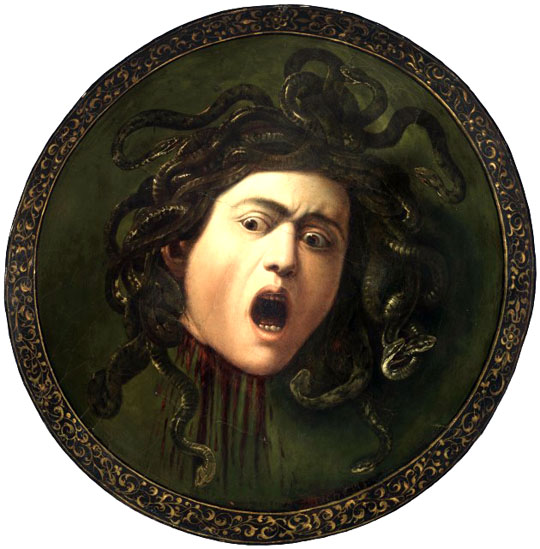
- Caravaggio's Medusa Murtola. The painting is named after the poet Gaspare Murtola who dedicated to it his celebrated madrigal Per lo scudo di Medusa (1603)
- Born: 1570; Genoa, Republic of Genoa
- Died: 1625 (aged 54–55); Corneto, Papal States
- Education: University of Genoa
- Occupations: Poet; Intellectual; Writer
- Writing career
- Language: Italian; Latin
- Notable work: La Creazione del mondo
- Literary movement: Baroque; Marinism

Gaspare Murtola (Italian pronunciation: [ˈɡaspare ˈmurtola]; d. 1624 or 1625) was an Italian poet and writer of madrigals. He is known for a bitter literary feud with Giambattista Marino, carried out "with sonnets, invectives, and pistol shots," and for references he makes in his poetry to art works by Caravaggio. His main work is the sacred poem La Creazione del mondo ("The Creation of the World," 1608).

== Biography ==
Gaspare Murtola was born in Genoa, and studied literature and law in his native place. He went to Rome as secretary to Giacomo Serra, who became Cardinal and was ambassador of the Pope to the Emperor. Murtola accompanied him on this journey to Vienna. Afterwards, being in Turin, Murtola attracted the attention of Charles Emmanuel I, Duke of Savoy, and was made his secretary.

While at the Court of Savoy, he published his poem on the Creation: Della Creazione del Mondo, Poema Sacro, Giorni Sette, Canti Sedici (Venice, 1608). Marino, who was then also in Turin, ridiculed the new poem in a satirical sonnet. A violent quarrel arose between the two poets. Marino followed up his first attack with a whole volley of sonnets which he called the Murtoleide; Murtola replied with a Marineide. Finally, when Marino appeared to be getting the better of the affair, Murtola waited for his enemy one day in a street of Turin with an arquebus. He missed Marino, but wounded Marino's companion, a favorite of the Duke. For this attempt he was imprisoned, but Marino generously secured his release. Murtola nevertheless is said to have intrigued to drive Marino from Turin, and to have succeeded. He himself left soon after, and passed the remainder of his life in Rome. It is related that Paul V once questioned him on his attack on Marino, and received from the poet the ambiguous reply: 'È vero, ho fallito.'

Prior to the publication of his Creazione Murtola had been known as a Latin poet for his Nutriciarum sive Naeniarum libri tres (Venice, 1602), and as a lyric poet for his Rime (Venice, 1604). The Rime is divided into several books entitled: Gli Amori, Gli Occhi, Le Veneri. The verses are mostly madrigals, and in taste and subject often recall the writer's rival, Marino. Like Marino, Murtola wrote madrigals on works of art, including several poems on works by Caravaggio. In a madrigal of 1603, he responded to Caravaggio's Medusa with "Flee, for if your eyes are petrified in amazement, she will turn you to stone."

== Main works ==
- La cetra (in Italian). Roma: Guglielmo Facciotto. 1600.
- Rime (in Italian). R. Meglietti. 1604.
- Della creatione del mondo, poema sacro (in Italian). Venetia: B. Pulciani. 1608.
- Duorum illustrium Poetarum Jo. Joviani Pontani etc. et Gasparis Murtulae J. C. Ianuensis, Naeniarum, sive Nutriciarum libri tres (in Latin). Viterbo: Girolamo Discepolo. 1613.
- Delle pescatorie (in Italian). Roma: Euangelista Deuchino. 1617.

== Bibliography ==
- Russo, Emilio (2012). "MURTOLA, Gasparo". Dizionario Biografico degli Italiani (in Italian). Vol. 77: Morlini–Natolini. Rome: Istituto dell'Enciclopedia Italiana. ISBN 978-88-12-00032-6.
- Hutton, James (1935). The Greek Anthology in Italy to the Year 1800. Ithaca: Cornell University Press. pp. 347–348.
- Slawinski, M. (2002). "Murtola, Gaspare". The Oxford Companion to Italian Literature. Oxford University Press.
- Marini, Maurizio; Mahon, Denis (2004). "Caravaggio, Murtola e "la chioma avvelenata di Medusa"". Artibus et Historiae. 25 (49): 175–84. doi:10.2307/1483752. JSTOR 1483752.
- Fossi, Gloria (2004). Uffizi: Art, History, Collections. Giunti Editore. ISBN 9788809036758.
