= Medusa's Head =

Essay by Sigmund Freud

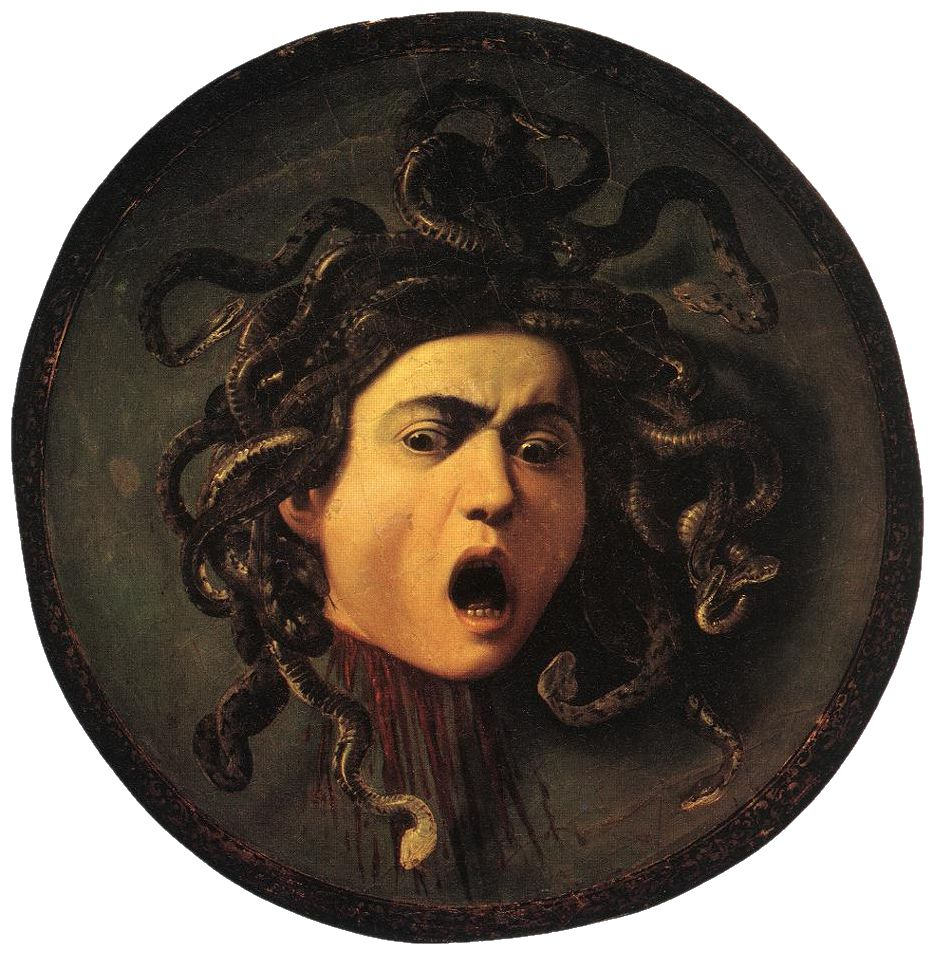
Medusa oil painting by Carvaggio (1597)

"Medusa's Head" (Das Medusenhaupt, 1922), by Sigmund Freud, is a very short, posthumously published essay on the subject of the Medusa myth.

Equating decapitation with castration, Freud maintained that the terror of Medusa was a reflection of the castration complex aroused in the young boy when the sight of the female genitals brought home the truth that females have no penis.

== Analysis ==
The hair upon Medusa's head is frequently represented in works of art in the form of snakes. Freud considered that, as penis symbols derived from the pubic hair, they serve to mitigate the horror of the complex, as a form of overcompensation.

This sight of Medusa's head makes the spectator stiff with terror, turns him to stone. Observe that we have here once again the same origin from the castration complex and the same transformation of effect. In the original situation, it offers consolation to the spectator: he is still in possession of a penis, and the stiffening reassures him of the fact.

Medusa's head as a symbol of horror was classically worn upon her dress by the virgin goddess Athena. Freud considered that as a result, she became the unapproachable woman who repels all sexual desire by carrying (symbolically) the genitals of the mother.

== Protection ==
Freud argued further that, because displaying the genitals (male and female) can be an apotropaic act - one aimed at intimidating and driving off the spectator - so too was the defensive use of Medusa's head in classical Greece. Representations of her head - the so-called Gorgoneion - were pervasive there, appearing on walls, gates, fortifications, armour, and personal amulets.

== Literary references ==
The heroine of Possession: A Romance claims to be planning a paper "to do with Melusina and Medusa and Freud's idea that the Medusa-head was castration-fantasy, female sexuality, feared, not desired".

A set of allusive references to the matters of Freud's essay also helps to organise a central concern with male consciousness and female sexuality in Iris Murdoch's 1961 novel A Severed Head.

== Criticism ==
- Later analysts have linked the Medusa's effect of petrification to the freezing effect of fear.
- Feminist criticism would fault Freud's (brief) essay for being limited to the perspective of the male gaze.

== See also ==
- Abjection
- Counterphobic attitude
- Evil spirit
- Medusa complex
- Phallic woman
- Rabelais
- Sexual fetishism
- Vagina dentata
