= Medusa complex =

Psychological complex: emotionally frozen

Medusa complex is a psychological complex revolving around the petrification or freezing of human emotion, and drawing on the classical myth of the Medusa.

== Origins ==
The term Medusa Complex was coined in 1948 by Gaston Bachelard to cover the feeling of petrification induced by the threat of the parental gaze. A mute, paralysed fury responds to the danger of the obliteration of an individual consciousness by an external Other (and perhaps by the corresponding internalised desire to obliterate the subjectivity of others in turn).

== Developments ==
Later writers have developed Bachelard's idea in various ways.

- Attachment theory uses the Medusa Complex to refer to a self-destructive early state of inwardly directed aggression produced by a disruption of the mother/child mutual gaze.
- Marion Woodman saw the Medusa Complex as a dissociated state produced by paralysis of the fight-or-flight response in a state of petrified fear. She also saw it as the possible by-product of a conflict between an idealised, perfect state and the actual reality of one's feelings and emotions.
- Marjorie Garber saw the Medusa Complex pervading Macbeth in the form of gender trauma.
- Francois-Xavier Gleyzon used the Medusa Complex in reference to Shakespeare's King Lear.

== See also ==
- Bruno Bettelheim
- Gargoyle
- Golem
- Louis MacNeice
- Petrifaction in mythology and fiction
- Sophie Calle
