= Caput Medusae =

Caput Medusae is Latin for "head of Medusa". It may also refer to:

- Medusa's head, a part of the constellation Perseus
- Caput medusae, distended and engorged paraumbilical veins
- Gorgoneion (Γοργόνειον), Greek for "head of Gorgon". Athena fixed the "head of Medusa" into center of her shield, aegis (αιγίς).
