= Medusa (Caravaggio) =

Painting by Caravaggio

- Testa di Medusa (Italian)
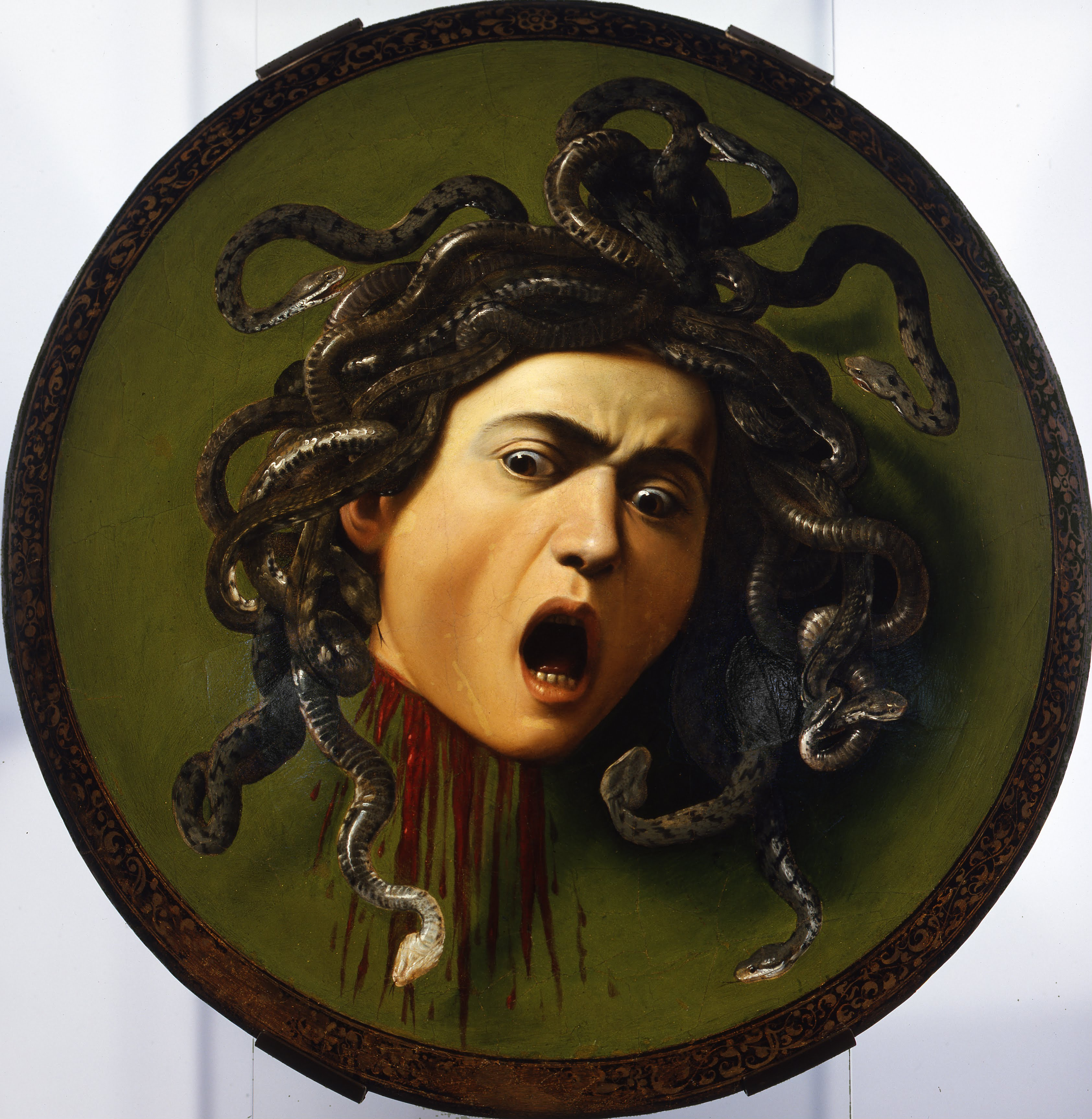
- Artist: Caravaggio
- Year: 1597
- Type: Oil on canvas mounted on wood
- Dimensions: 60 cm × 55 cm (24 in × 22 in)
- Location: Uffizi, Florence

Two versions of Medusa were created by the Italian Baroque painter Michelangelo Merisi da Caravaggio, one in 1596 and the other in ca. 1597. Both depict the moment from Greek mythology in which the Gorgon Medusa is killed by the demigod Perseus, but the Medusas are also self-portraits. Due to its bizarre and intricate design, the painting is said to display Caravaggio's unique fascination with violence and realism. The Medusa was commissioned by the Italian diplomat Francesco Maria del Monte, who planned to gift the commemorative shield to Ferdinando I de' Medici and have it placed in the Medici collection. It is now located in the Uffizi Museum in Florence without signature.

== History ==
In the 1590s, Caravaggio was working in Rome, and his success and wealth were increasing. However, the time in which he painted the two versions of the Medusa was characterized by several run-ins with the law. In July 1597, Caravaggio and his partner Prospero Orsi became involved as witnesses in a crime that occurred near San Luigi de' Francesi. In one instance, a barber named Luca gave a testimony about Caravaggio where he provided a description regarding his mysterious attire:

"This painter is a stocky young man…with a thin black beard, thick eyebrows and black eyes, who goes dressed all in black, in a rather disorderly fashion, wearing black hose that is a little bit threadbare, and who has a thick head of hair, long over his forehead."

At the time, there was an unsolved case in which two items were reported as being missing—a dark cloak and a small dagger. As a result of his mysterious behavior and affiliation with cloaks, Caravaggio was arrested several times. He told authorities that he liked dressing in dark attire to avoid drawing unnecessary attention to himself, which was also why he preferred to make late night trips. On May 4, 1598, he was arrested again for possessing a sword in public, and defended himself by saying:

“I carry the sword by right because I am Painter to Cardinal del Monte. I am in his service and live in his house. I am entered on his household payroll.”

Caravaggio's paintings were never in tune with the idealized themes that were prevalent during the time period. Instead, he became more intrigued with the idea of realism and incorporated it into his paintings such as Boy with a Basket of Fruit, The Fortune Teller, The Cardsharps, Bacchus, and even The Musicians, which were all painted within the same time period. When he painted Medusa, Caravaggio hit a great milestone in his life - he was given a chance to decorate the Contarelli Chapel, in which he created realistic images regarding the life of St. Matthew himself. Some of these paintings include Saint Matthew and the Angel, The Martyrdom of Saint Matthew, and The Calling of Saint Matthew. This opportunity to paint the chapel gave him great advantage and a sense of motivation to incorporate more realism in his artworks.

== Versions ==
The first version of the painting, created in 1596, is known as Murtula. It was named after poet Gaspare Murtola, who wrote of Medusa, "flee, for if your eyes are petrified in amazement, she will turn you to stone." It measures 48 by 55 cm in length and is signed Michel A F (Latin: Michel Angelo Fecit), meaning "Michel Angelo made [this]." This work is privately owned.

The second version of the painting is known as Medusa (Italian: Testa di Medusa). It is slightly bigger than the first, measuring 60×55 cm in length. Although the work is not signed or dated, it is often dated as 1597. It is held in the Uffizi Gallery.

== Subject matter ==
The painting depicts the severed head of Medusa, a figure from Greek myth. Medusa was once a human woman, but the goddess Athena cursed her to live as a monster after Poseidon raped her in one of Athena's temples. Her hair was turned to snakes, and anybody who looked at her would be turned to stone. Perseus, the demigod child of Zeus, eventually decapitated Medusa using gifts from the gods.

Caravaggio replaced Medusa's face with his own, allowing him to position himself as being immune to her fatal gaze. Though the head is decapitated, it still appears conscious, with the painting capturing its final moments before death. The face's eyes are widened, and its brows are creased; its mouth hangs open. Blood pours out of the severed neck.

== Description ==
=== Material ===
The chemical composition of this painting is extremely complex. Caravaggio used a circular shield made from poplar wood as a base for this painting. The shield was covered by linen, on which four different layers of paint—known as preparation layers—were added to help create the basis for the painting. On top of the preparation layers, an additional layer was applied to make the background appear more reflective. On top of this reflective layer, another layer was applied (the green background that is shown on the painting)—this layer consists of a mixture of verdigris and lead-tin yellow paint. On top of this background layer, three more layers consisting of mixtures of siccative oils, turpentine and mastic with traces of beeswax were applied to form the painting. At last, a few more layers were added to help conserve the painting.

=== Style ===
Caravaggio employs tenebrism and realism to create the illusion of a three-dimensional work. Medusa's cheeks and jawline are also elongated to complement the nature of the painting.

Caravaggio chose to mount the canvas on a convex wooden shield because it would draw comparisons to the much-celebrated work of Leonardo da Vinci. A well-known anecdote of the time stated that Leonardo's father had once asked him to decorate the surface of a shield. In response, Leonardo had painted a "hybrid monster," combining the attributes of animals such as snakes, insects and lizards. Medusa, with her snakes for hair, could also be considered a "hybrid monster."

== Influence ==
Caravaggio depicted the act of decapitation in several of his other paintings, including Judith Beheading Holofernes, David with the Head of Goliath, and The Beheading of St John the Baptist.

== See also ==
- List of paintings by Caravaggio

== Sources ==
1. Stanska, Zuzanna (5 August 2018). "The Shiny Shield With Caravaggio's Medusa". Daily Art Magazine.
2. Graham-Dixon, Andrew. “Caravaggio.” Encyclopædia Britannica, Encyclopædia Britannica, Inc., 4 February 2019.
3. Barolsky, Paul (April 2013). "The Ambiguity of Caravaggio's 'Medusa'". Source: Notes in the History of Art. 32 (3): 28–29. doi:10.1086/sou.32.3.23392422. JSTOR 23392422. S2CID 191384440.
4. "Perseus: Greek Mythology." Encyclopædia Britannica, 14 February 2019.
5. Jones, Jonathan. "Medusa, Caravaggio (c 1598)." The Guardian, 25 Jan, 2003.
6. Puttfarken, Thomas (2007). "Caravaggio and the Representation of Violence". Umeni / Art. 55 (3): 183–195. EBSCOhost 28115340.
7. Posèq, Avigdor W. G. (1990). "Caravaggio and the Antique". Artibus et Historiae. 11 (21): 147–167. doi:10.2307/1483388. JSTOR 1483388.
8. Favaro, Monica; Vigato, Pietro A.; Andreotti, Alessia; Colombini, Maria Perla (1 December 2005). "La Medusa by Caravaggio: characterisation of the painting technique and evaluation of the state of conservation". Journal of Cultural Heritage. 6 (4): 295–305. doi:10.1016/j.culher.2005.04.003.
