= Medusa (Leonardo) =

Either of two lost paintings by Leonardo da Vinci

Medusa is either of two paintings described in Giorgio Vasari's Life of Leonardo da Vinci as being among Leonardo's earliest works. Neither painting survived.

== First version ==
In his Vita di Leonardo (1568), Vasari reports that, as a very young man, Leonardo represented the head of Medusa on a wooden shield after a request by his father, Ser Piero da Vinci:

It is said that Ser Piero da Vinci, at his villa, was besought as a favour, by a peasant of his, who had made a buckler with his own hands out of a fig-tree that he had cut down on the farm, to have it painted for him in Florence, which he did very willingly, since the countryman was very skilful at catching birds and fishing, and Ser Piero made much use of him in these pursuits. Thereupon, having had it taken to Florence, without saying a word to Leonardo as to whose it was, he asked him to paint something upon it. Leonardo, having one day taken this buckler in his hands, and seeing it twisted, badly made, and clumsy, straightened it by the fire, and, having given it to a turner, from the rude and clumsy thing that it was, caused it to be made smooth and even.

And afterwards, having given it a coat of gesso, and having prepared it in his own way, he began to think what he could paint upon it, that might be able to terrify all who should come upon it, producing the same effect as once did the head of Medusa. For this purpose, then, Leonardo carried to a room of his own into which no one entered save himself alone, lizards great and small, crickets, serpents, butterflies, grasshoppers, bats, and other strange kinds of suchlike animals (some of these animals he dissected), out of the number of which, variously put together, he formed a great ugly creature, most horrible and terrifying, which emitted a poisonous breath and turned the air to flame; and he made it coming out of a dark and jagged rock, belching forth venom from its open throat, fire from its eyes, and smoke from its nostrils, in so strange a fashion that it appeared altogether a monstrous and horrible thing; and so long did he labour over making it, that the stench of the dead animals in that room was past bearing, but Leonardo did not notice it, so great was the love that he bore towards art.

The work being finished, although it was no longer asked for either by the countryman or by his father, Leonardo told the latter that he might send for the buckler at his convenience, since, for his part, it was finished. Ser Piero having therefore gone one morning to the room for the buckler, and having knocked at the door, Leonardo opened to him, telling him to wait a little; and, having gone back into the room, he adjusted the buckler in a good light on the easel, and put to the window, in order to make a soft light, and then he bade him come in to see it. Ser Piero, at the first glance, taken by surprise, gave a sudden start, not thinking that that was the buckler, nor merely painted the form that he saw upon it, and, falling back a step, Leonardo checked him, saying, "This work serves the end for which it was made; take it, then, and carry it away, since this is the effect that it was meant to produce."

This thing appeared to Ser Piero nothing short of a miracle, and he praised very greatly the ingenious idea of Leonardo; and then, having privately bought from a peddler another buckler, painted with a heart transfixed by an arrow, he presented it to the countryman, who remained obliged to him for as long as he lived. Afterwards, Ser Piero sold the buckler of Leonardo secretly to some merchants in Florence, for a hundred ducats; and in a short time it came into the hands of the Duke of Milan, having been sold to him by the said merchants for three hundred ducats.

Although art historians have doubted the veracity of this anecdote, Leonardo's shield (long since lost) has been said to inspire several early 17th-century painters who may have seen it in the collection of Ferdinand I de Medici. Rubens and Caravaggio are known to have painted their own versions of the subject, but their indebtedness to Leonardo's painting (assuming they had seen it) is uncertain and potentially unknowable.

== Uffizi painting ==
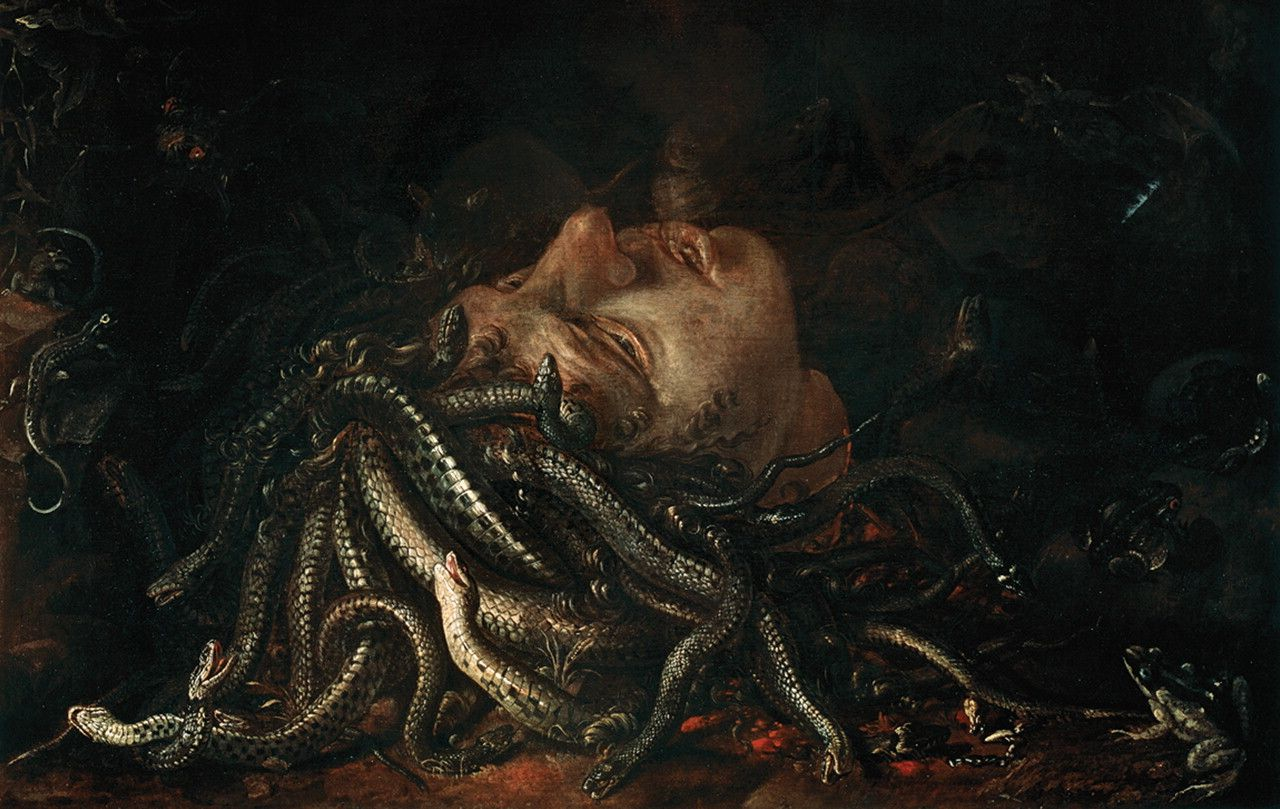
Medusa's Head, a Flemish painter, ca. 1600, Uffizi Gallery

In 1782, Leonardo's biographer Luigi Lanzi, while making a search for his paintings in the Uffizi, discovered a depiction of Medusa's head which he erroneously attributed to Leonardo, based on Vasari's description of Leonardo's second version of the subject:

The fancy came to him to paint a picture in oils of the head of a Medusa, with the head attired with a coil of snakes, the most strange and extravagant invention that could ever be imagined, but since it was a work that took time, it remained unfinished, as everything happened with almost all his things. It is among the rare works of art in the Palace of Duke Cosimo...

Lanzi summed up his opinion on the newly discovered painting in his description of the Florentine gallery:

Finally on the following day one sees the head of Medusa with serpents so realistic that it makes credible what we read of Vinci; where in a painting produced like this in which one saw fear and fled; something that does no less honor to modern painting than did the grapes of Zeuxis to the horses of Apelles... Nevertheless the work lacks the final finish, as do the works of Vinci for the most part.

In the period of Romanticism, the reputed Leonardo garnered much praise. Its full-page engravings, first produced in Florence in 1828, spread across Europe, making the painting one of the most popular in Leonardo's corpus of works. In 1851, Jean Baptiste Gustave Planche proclaimed: "I do not hesitate to say that in the Medusa of the Uffizi there is the germ of what we admire in the Gioconda of the Louvre".

As late as 1868, Walter Pater (in The Renaissance) singled out Medusa as one of the most arresting works by Leonardo. In the 20th century, Bernard Berenson and other leading critics argued against Leonardo's authorship of the Uffizi painting. It is now believed to be a work of an anonymous Flemish painter, active ca. 1600.

== See also ==
- List of works by Leonardo da Vinci
