= Cribb (surname) =

Cribb, also spelt Cribbs, is a surname of Old English origin derived from crib(b) "manger". It is an occupational surname for cowherds. Notable people with the surname include:

Australia

- Alan Cribb (1925–2026), botanist and mycologist
- Benjamin Cribb (1807–1874), pioneer and politician in Queensland
- James Clarke Cribb (1856–1926), politician in Queensland
- Joan Cribb (1930–2023), botanist and mycologist
- John Cribb (1950–2018), triple murderer
- Julian Cribb, science writer
- Margaret Cribb (1924–1993), political scientist
- Reg Cribb, playwright
- Robert Cribb (1805–1883), pioneer and politician in Queensland
- Roger Cribb (1948–2007), archaeologist and anthropologist
- Thomas Bridson Cribb (1845–1913), politician in Queensland

Canada;

- Ernest Cribb (1885–1957), sailor

New Zealand;

- Bruce Cribb (born 1946), speedway rider
- Jo Cribb, public servant
- Otto Cribb (1878–1901), boxer
- Ron Cribb (born 1976), rugby union player
- Tai Cribb (born 2004), rugby union player

United Kingdom

- Guy Cribb (born 1970), windsurfer
- Harvey Cribb (born 2006), footballer
- Joe Cribb (born 1948), numismatist
- Joseph Cribb (1892–1967), sculptor
- Stan Cribb (1905–1989), footballer
- Steve Cribb (1944–1994), disability rights activist and numismatist
- Tom Cribb (1781–1848), bare-knuckle boxer

United States of America

- Claire Cribbs (1912–1985), basketball player and coach
- James Cribbs (born 1966), football player
- Joe Cribbs (born 1958), football player
- Josh Cribbs (born 1983), football player
- T. Kenneth Cribb Jr. (born 1948), activist

Fiction

- Sergeant Daniel Cribb is the main character in a series of novels by Peter Lovesey

== See also ==
- Cribb & Foote, department stores in Australia
- Cribb Island, Queensland
- Cribbs Causeway, mall in Bristol
- The fictional Cribb brothers are singers in a satirical band, The Hee Bee Gee Bees
