= Csiromedusa =

Scientific classification
- Kingdom: Animalia
- Phylum: Cnidaria
- Class: Hydrozoa
- Order: Narcomedusae
- Family: Csiromedusidae; Gershwin & Zeidler, 2010
- Genus: Csiromedusa; Gershwin & Zeidler, 2010
- Species: C. medeopolis

Binomial name
- Csiromedusa medeopolis Gershwin & Zeidler, 2010

Species of cnidarian

Csiromedusa medeopolis is a species of hydrozoan described in 2010. It was discovered in the estuarine waters of the River Derwent near to the Commonwealth Scientific and Industrial Research Organisation's Marine and Atmospheric Research branch in Hobart, Tasmania, Australia. C. medeopolis has been described as presenting a new family and genus as well as species.

Its binomial name is derived from "CSIRO jellyfish" and "city of gonads". Unlike most other jellyfish, males and females of C. medeopolis have many gonads located on their dorsal endoderm. These gonads have been described as arranged like "skyscrapers in a downtown business district".
