= Philomedusa vogtii =

Scientific classification
- Domain: Eukaryota
- Kingdom: Animalia
- Phylum: Cnidaria
- Subphylum: Anthozoa
- Class: Hexacorallia
- Order: Actiniaria
- Family: Haloclavidae
- Genus: Philomedusa; Müller, 1860
- Species: P. vogtii

Binomial name
- Philomedusa vogtii Müller, 1860

Species of sea anemone

Philomedusa is a monotypic genus of cnidarians belonging to the family Haloclavidae. The only species is Philomedusa vogtii.
