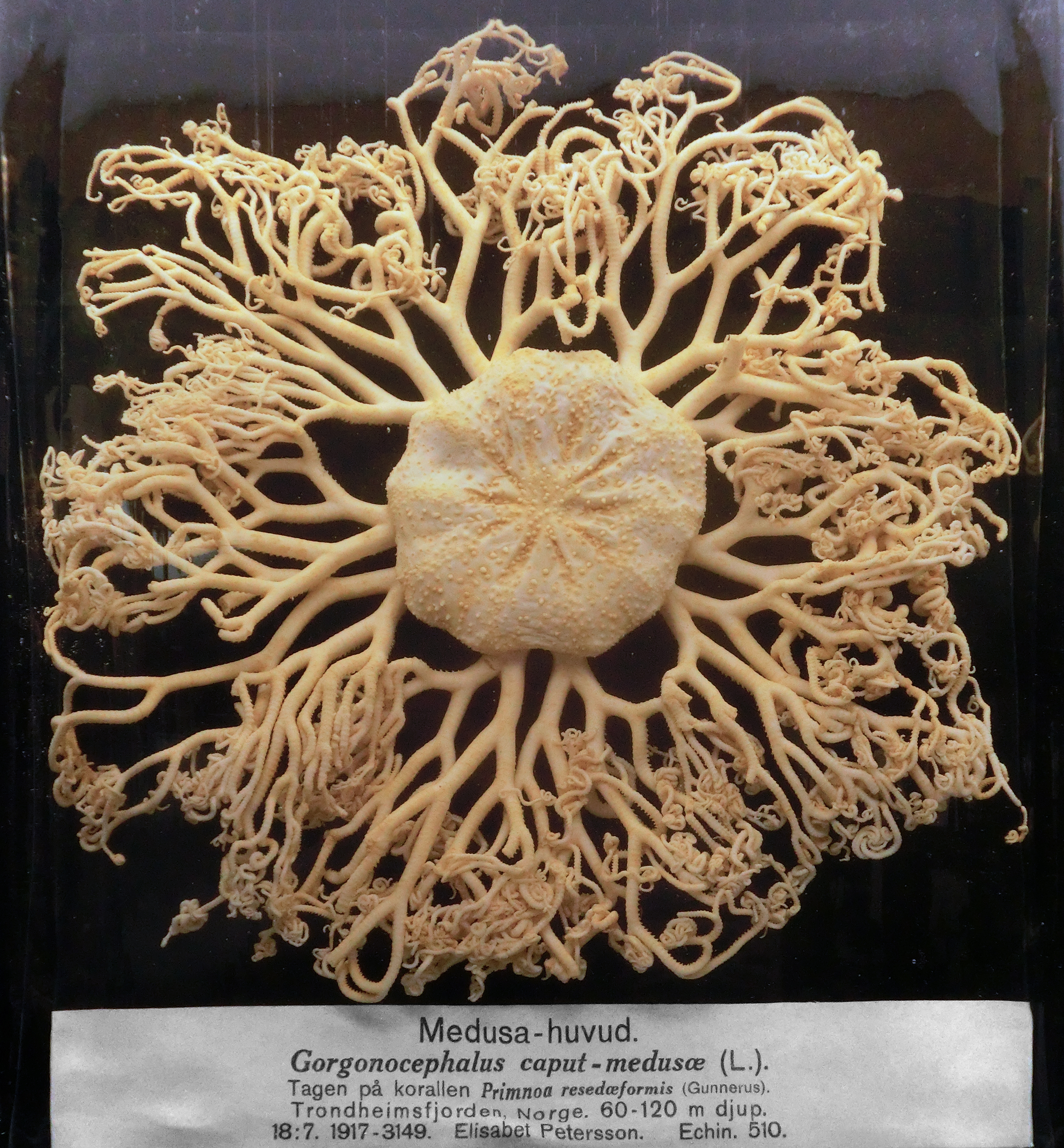

Scientific classification
- Kingdom: Animalia
- Phylum: Echinodermata
- Class: Ophiuroidea
- Order: Phrynophiurida
- Family: Gorgonocephalidae
- Genus: Gorgonocephalus
- Species: G. caputmedusae

Binomial name
- Gorgonocephalus caputmedusae (Linnaeus, 1758)

= Gorgonocephalus caputmedusae =

Species of gorgon's head

Gorgonocephalus caputmedusae, also known as a Gorgon's head or Medusa's head is a species of Gorgonocephalus, a genus of brittle star. The species has five main arms, which, however, are divided into a very large number of sub-arms; an individual may have hundreds of arm tips. These arms extend from a central body that is about 9 centimeters in diameter.

They live off zooplankton.
