= Zeidler =

Zeidler is a German occupational surname meaning "Beekeeper". Notable people with the surname include:

- Alfred Zeidler (1902–?), German SS concentration camp commandant
- Carl Zeidler (1908–1942), American mayor
- David Zeidler (1918–1998), Australian chemist and industrialist
- Eberhard Heinrich Zeidler (1926–2022), German-Canadian architect
- Eberhard Hermann Erich Zeidler (1940–2016), German mathematician
- Frank Zeidler (1912–2006), American politician
- Judith Zeidler (born 1968), German rower
- Othmar Zeidler (1850–1911), Austrian chemist
- Peter Zeidler (born 1962), German football manager
- Susanna Elizabeth Zeidler (1657–c. 1706), German poet
- Wolfgang Zeidler (1924–1987), German legal scholar and judge
