= Dohalice =

- Municipality
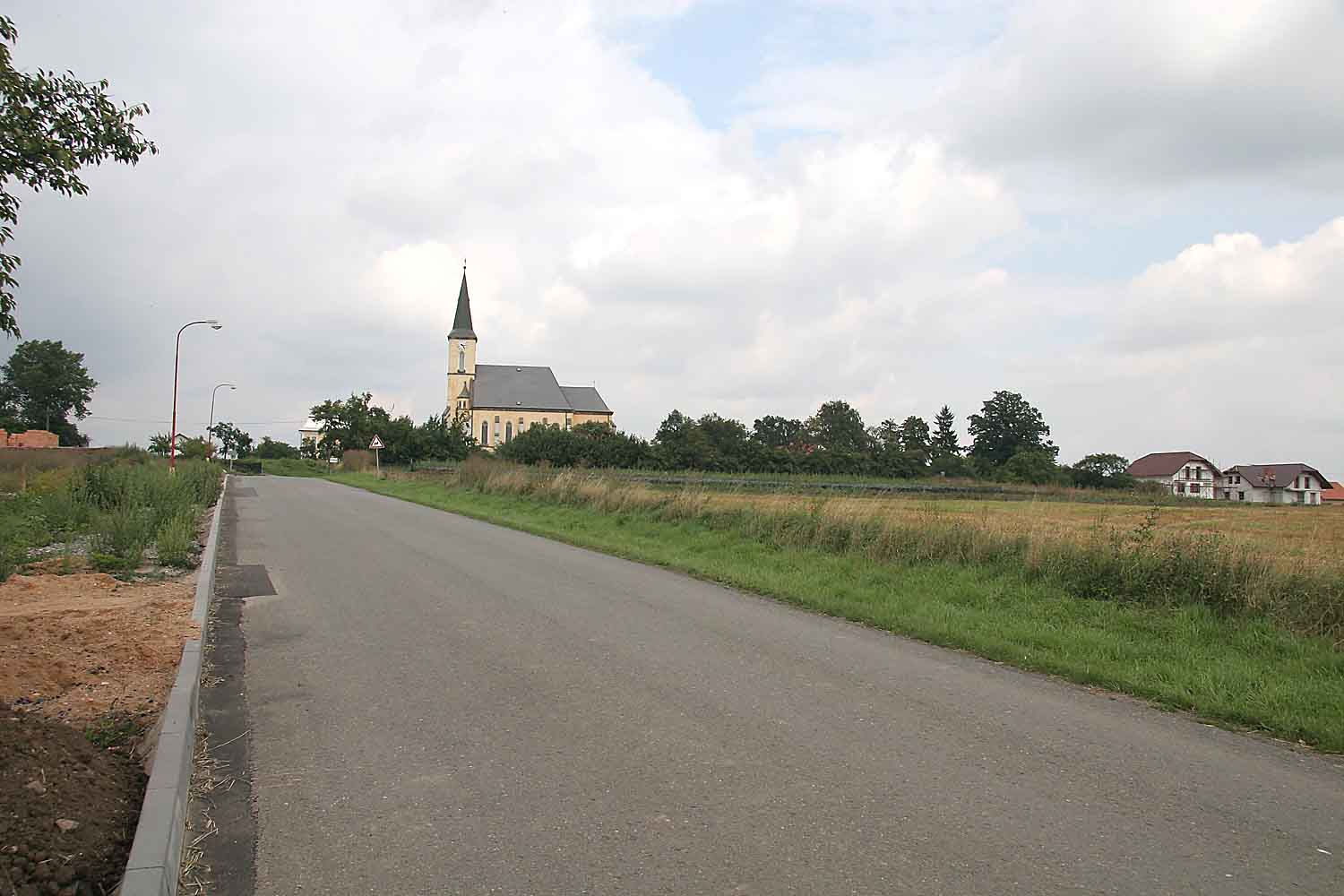
- Church of Saint John the Baptist

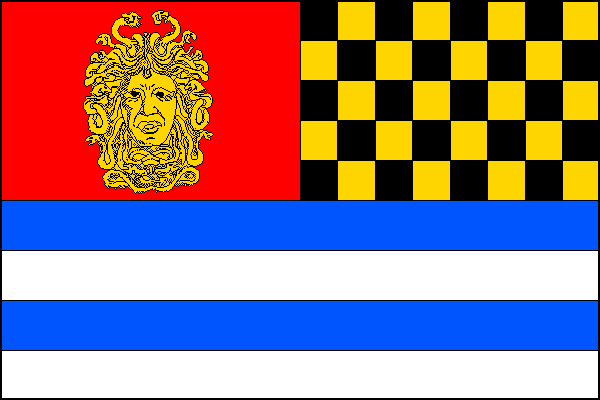
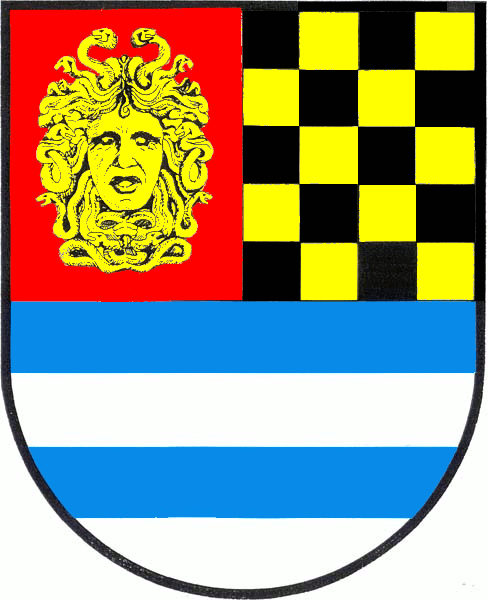
- Flag Coat of arms

- Location in the Czech Republic
- Coordinates: 50°17′14″N 15°41′40″E
- Country: Czech Republic
- Region: Hradec Králové
- District: Hradec Králové
- First mentioned: 1352

Area
  - Total: 4.45 km^{2} (1.72 sq mi)
- Elevation: 259 m (850 ft)

Population (2026-01-01)
  - Total: 450
  - Density: 100/km^{2} (260/sq mi)
- Time zone: UTC+1 (CET)
  - Summer (DST): UTC+2 (CEST)
- Postal code: 503 13
- Website: www.dohalice.cz

Dohalice is a municipality and village in Hradec Králové District in the Hradec Králové Region of the Czech Republic. It has about 500 inhabitants.

== Administrative division ==
Dohalice consists of two municipal parts (in brackets population according to the 2021 census):

- Dohalice (351)
- Horní Dohalice (75)

== Demographics ==
Historical population
Year	Pop.	±%
1869	657	—
1880	668	+1.7%
1890	667	−0.1%
1900	621	−6.9%
1910	661	+6.4%
1921	722	+9.2%
1930	629	−12.9%
1950	449	−28.6%
1961	436	−2.9%
1970	387	−11.2%
1980	353	−8.8%
1991	379	+7.4%
2001	419	+10.6%
2011	457	+9.1%
2021	426	−6.8%
Source: Censuses
