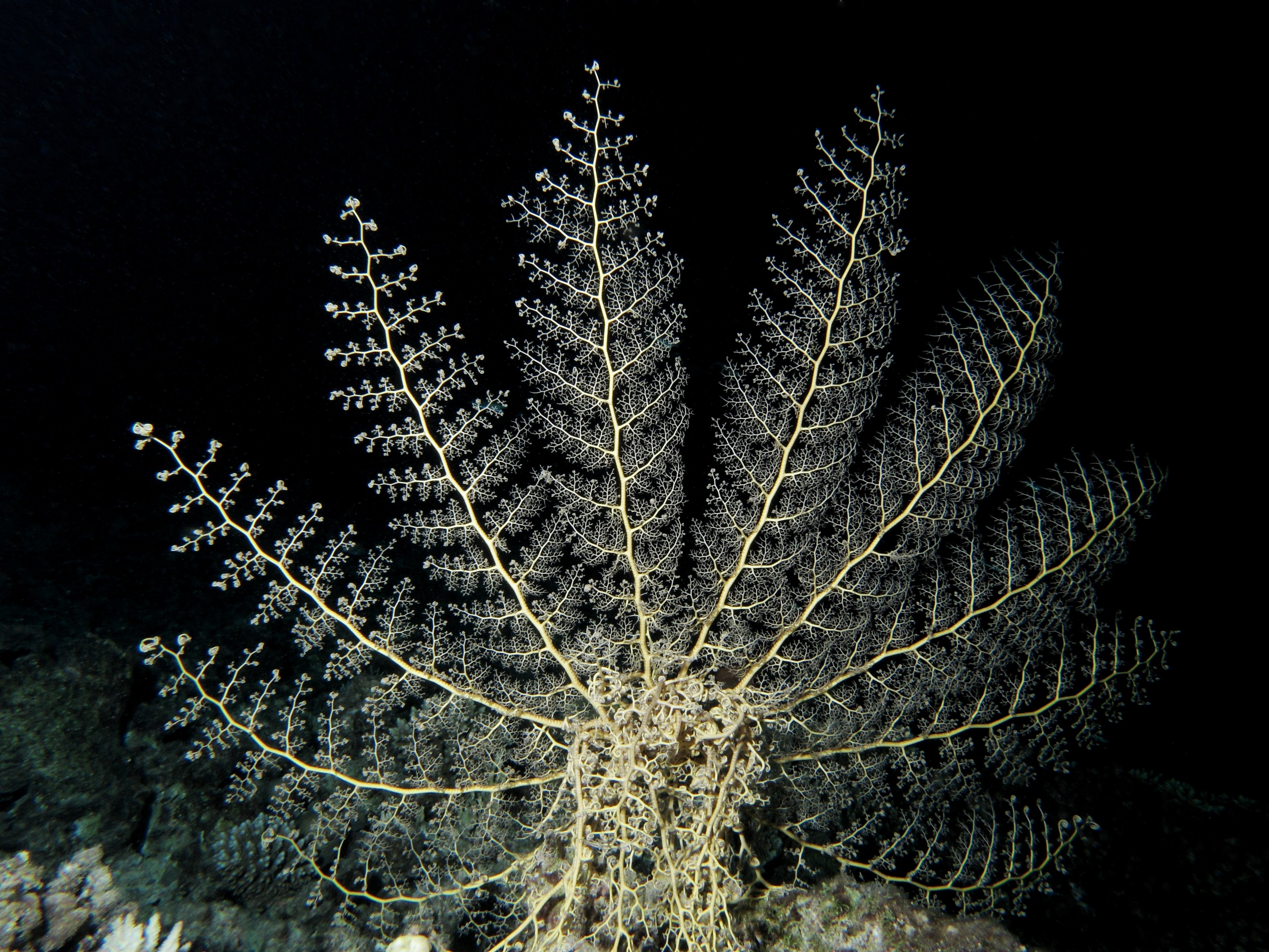
- Astroboa nuda feeding at night (Red Sea, Egypt)

Scientific classification
- Domain: Eukaryota
- Kingdom: Animalia
- Phylum: Echinodermata
- Class: Ophiuroidea
- Order: Phrynophiurida
- Family: Gorgonocephalidae
- Genus: Astroboa
- Species: A. nuda

Binomial name
- Astroboa nuda Lyman, 1874

Synonyms
- Astrophyton nudum Lyman, 1874; Astroraphis nudum Lyman, 1874; Astrophyton elegans Koehler, 1905; Astroboa nigra Döderlein, 1911

= Astroboa nuda =

Species of basket star

Astroboa nuda, known as the naked basket star, giant basket star, or cream basket star, (Note: Common names;) is a Gorgonocephalid basket star, a type of echinoderm. Its lengthy arms (spanning up to 1.0 metre (3.3 ft)) are highly branched. It inhabits reef slopes exposed to current throughout the Indo-Pacific, ranging from the Red Sea to New Caledonia. During the day, it coils into a tight ball inside a nook in the reef. At night, it spreads its arms to form a basket to feed on plankton.

== Description ==
This species is a typical basket star, with arms divided into five sections, with many smaller arms branching off of these sections. The arms can range throughout a variety of lengths both within and among individuals of Astroboa nuda. Shorter arms help the basket stars attach themselves to a substrate, and may also help carry food from the longer arms, which catch prey, to the mouth.

A. nuda have a simple digestive system, consisting of an esophagus connected to a sac-like stomach. They have no anus or intestines. The mouth is found on the underside of the body. The waste product of basket stars comes in the form of ammonia, and is removed from the body through diffusion.

The type specimen of Astroboa nuda was described in 1874 as Astrophyton nudum, from a specimen collected in the Philippines by "Semper". The specimen was noted as having "No tentacle scales on pores. Disk and arms quite smooth; the latter ringed with faint lines, which, magnified, are seen to be rows of minute conical papillae. One large madreporic body." The species possesses twenty arms which are smooth, lacking spines or "grains"; upon closer inspection a network of "cross-lines" are visible. Each joint of the arms is marked by a ridge of papillae, which are made up of hooks that become more annular farther up the arm, "encircling the arm in a single row" on the distal-most part of the arms. The disk is "essentially naked" or unornamented, which may be the reason for this basket star's name, although this was not directly stated. The "mouth-papillae", teeth, and "tooth-papillae" are of a uniform spiniform shape, three of which "represent teeth" are longer than the others. The madreporic body is at the "inner angle" of the interbrachial space, near the delineation of the animal's upper and lower surface. This specimen's color lightens at the tips, being yellowish brown after some time in alcohol. It is now labeled with the specimen number MCZ OPH-2911.

Live A. nuda are usually dark violet, black, or dark brown in color, but can occasionally be pale yellow (cream-colored). Typically, the yellow A. nuda tend to be larger. This variation in color and size have not been shown to cause differences in behavior.

== Habitat and Distribution ==
Astroboa nuda are found throughout the tropical seas of the Indo-Pacific, occurring in the Gulf of Aqaba at its northernmost range, down south to Madagascar, Mozambique and South Africa, and eastwards to the seas around Indonesia, the Philippines, the northern coast of Australia, New Caledonia, and Vanuatu.

Like other gorgonocephalids, they are benthic, commonly being found on the seafloor at depths greater than twenty meters, and up to 120 metres (390 ft) down in submarine canyons in Sodwana Bay. Unlike some other species within Ophiuroidea that form aggregations, Astroboa nuda are usually found alone or in groups of two to four.

== Ecology ==
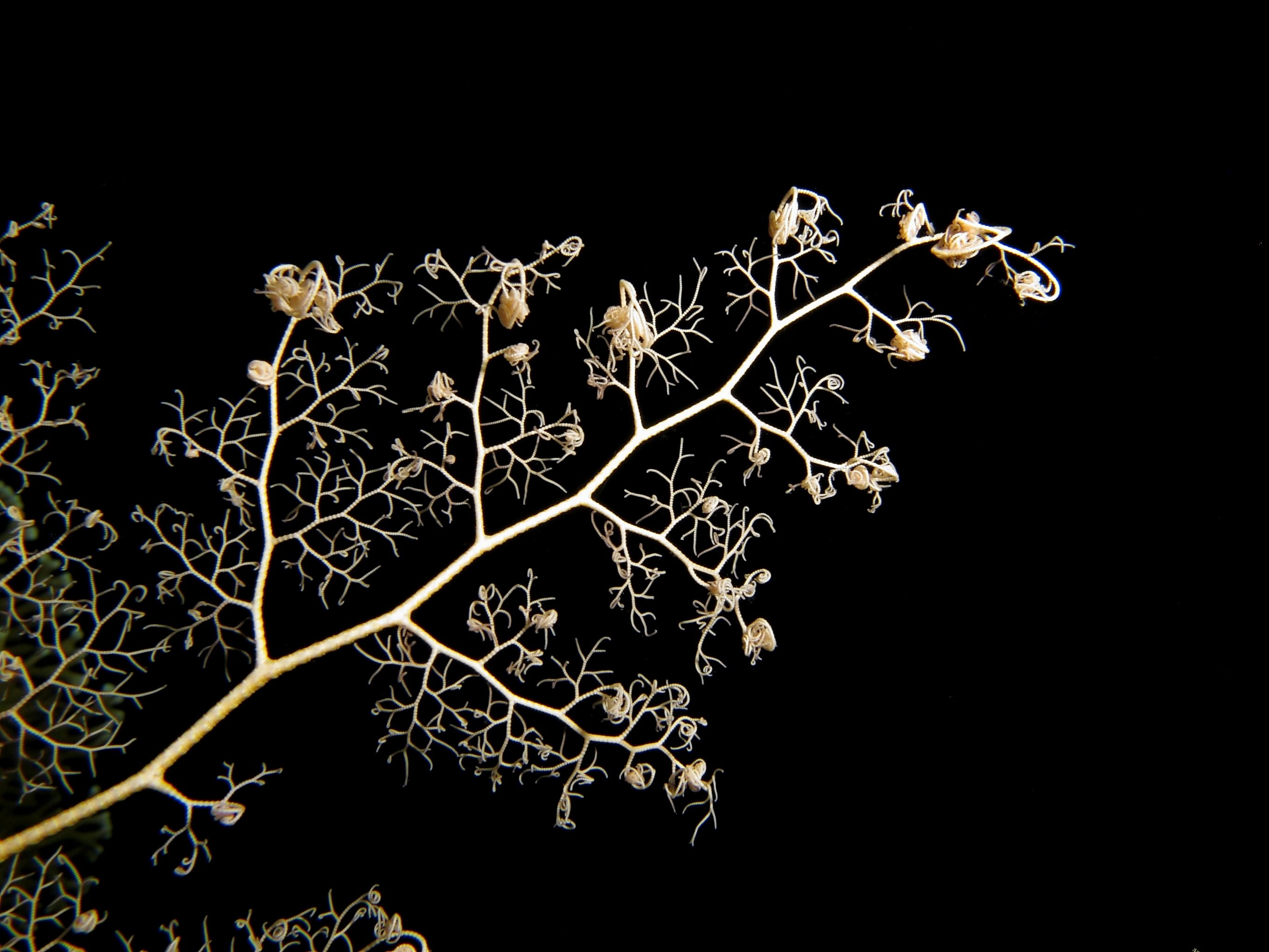
Highly branched arms of A. nuda (Red Sea, Egypt)

Astroboa nuda is a filter feeder and usually feeds on plankton, such as the larvae of decapods and copepods, as well as those of fish. Due to their light sensitivity, A. nuda hides in nearby shelters during the day, but branch out at night to feed; a high-powered electric torch may induce a similar retreat to shelter. They feed from approximately two hours after sunset, to about one hour before sunrise. They usually return to the same spot every night, and are active during all seasons of the year. They prefer calm, lightly disturbed waters. If the area is heavily disturbed causing irregular current, they usually remain sheltered behind coral heads, or other sections of the reef.

The class Ophiuroidea usually reproduces sexually, although asexual reproduction by fission can occur as well. Typically, there are separate male and female basket stars, which release sperm and eggs into the water. The sperm and eggs then join, and the larvae develop in the water; this process is known as broadcast spawning. Astroboa nuda itself has been observed off Egypt to broadcast spawn 6 to 5 days before the full moon, spawning in synchrony with species such as Tectus dentatus, Leiaster cf. leachi, Mithrodia clavigera, Pearsonothuria graeffei, and Tridacna maxima.

Basket stars generally have very few predators, as they are low in nutritional value, but are preyed upon by some fish. They may break off part or all of one of their arms in order to escape, but these arms will regenerate. Basket stars are often also caught by humans as part of by-catch during commercial fishing, especially when trawling.

=== Symbioses ===
Cardinalfish of the genus Apogon may shelter amongst the arms of Astroboa nuda, apparently feeding on the food captured by the basket star. A. nuda also serves as a host to large copepod populations. These copepods, of the species Doridicola connexus (Lichomolgidae) and Collocherides singularis (Asterocheridae) live in the stomach of the basket stars. In addition, C. singularis, C. astroboae, D. connexus, and D. micropus also live as ectoparasites.

== Gallery ==
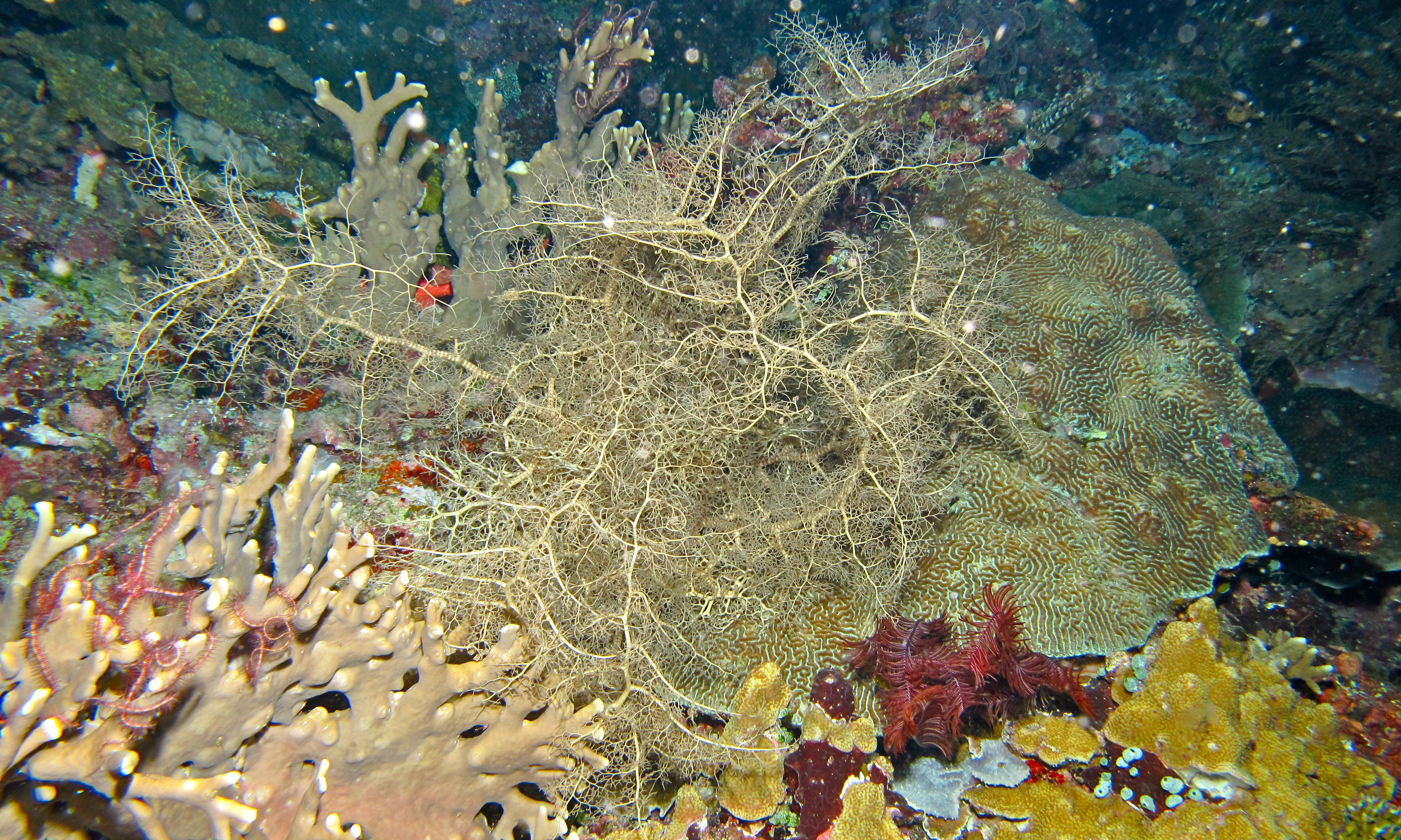

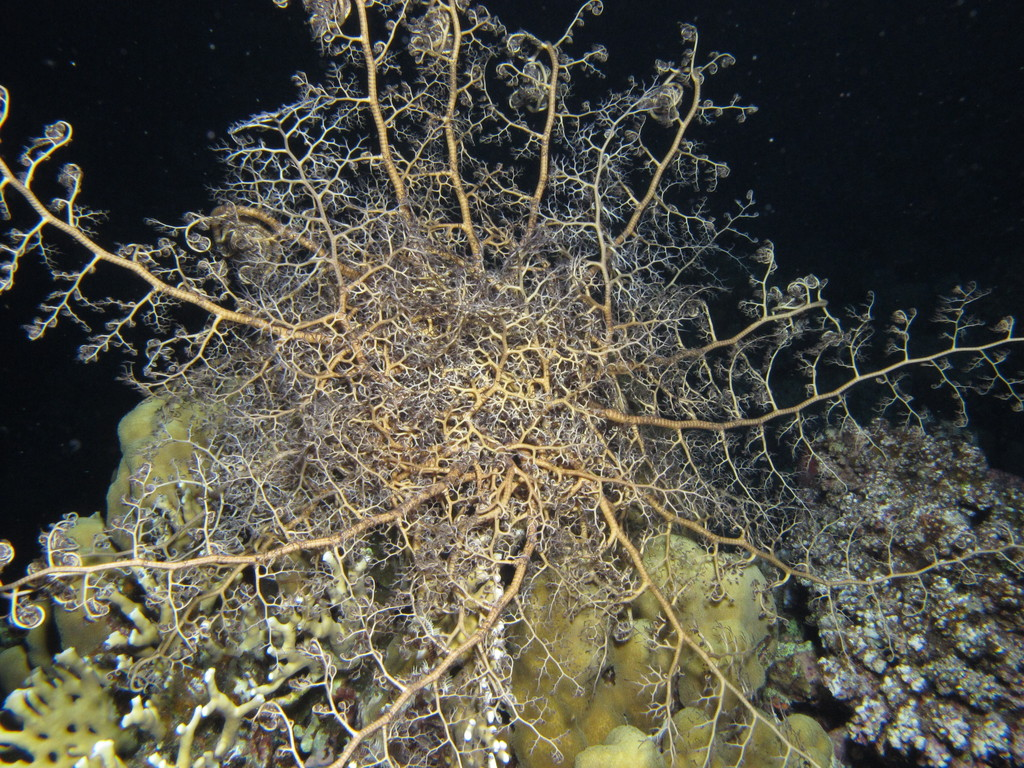

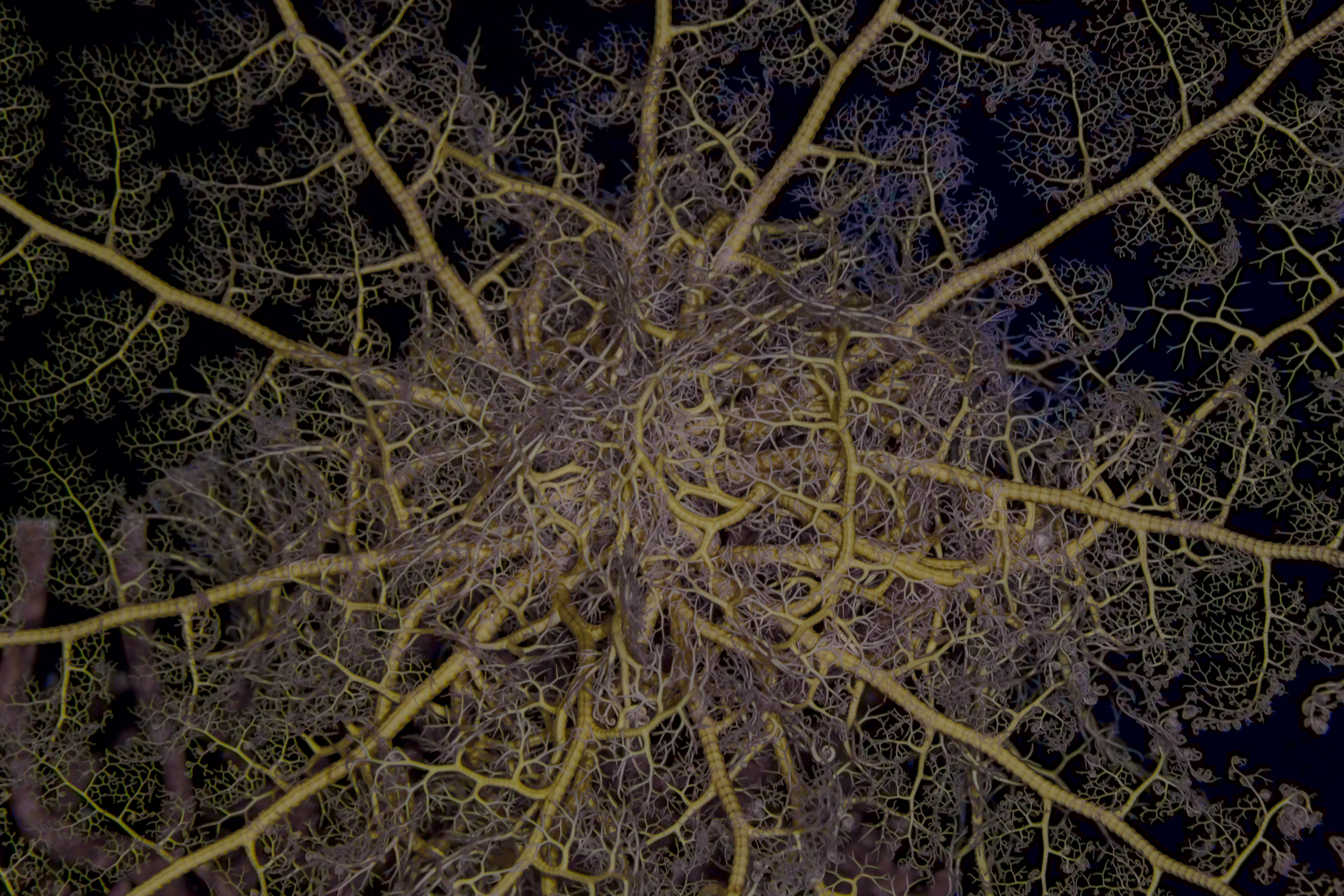

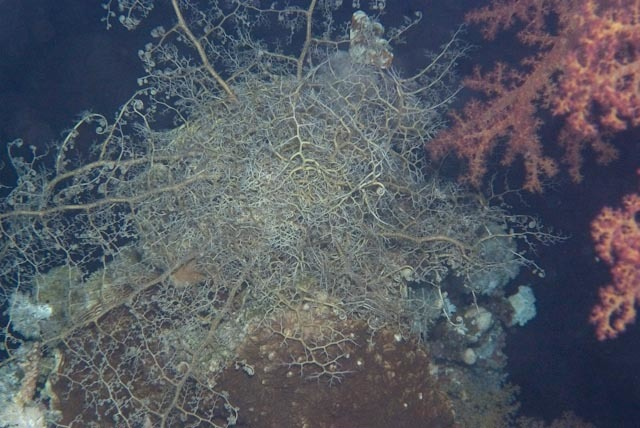

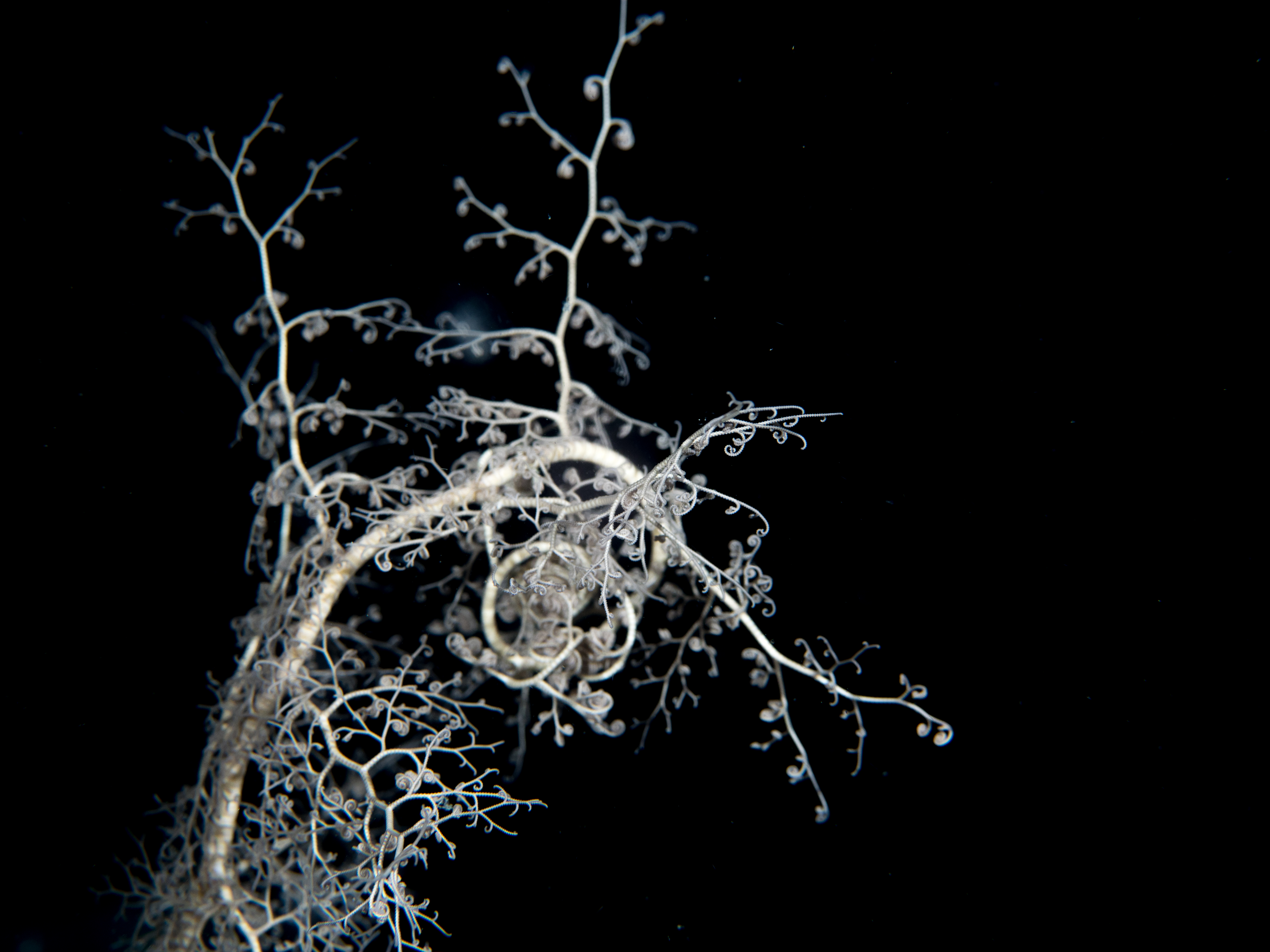

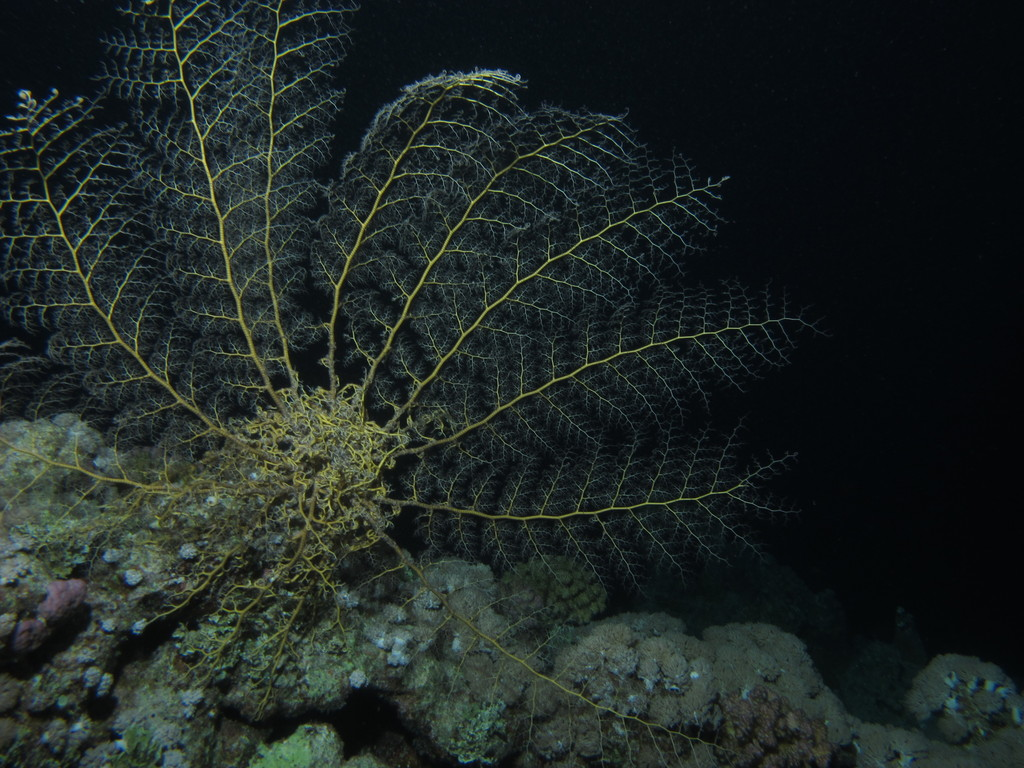
