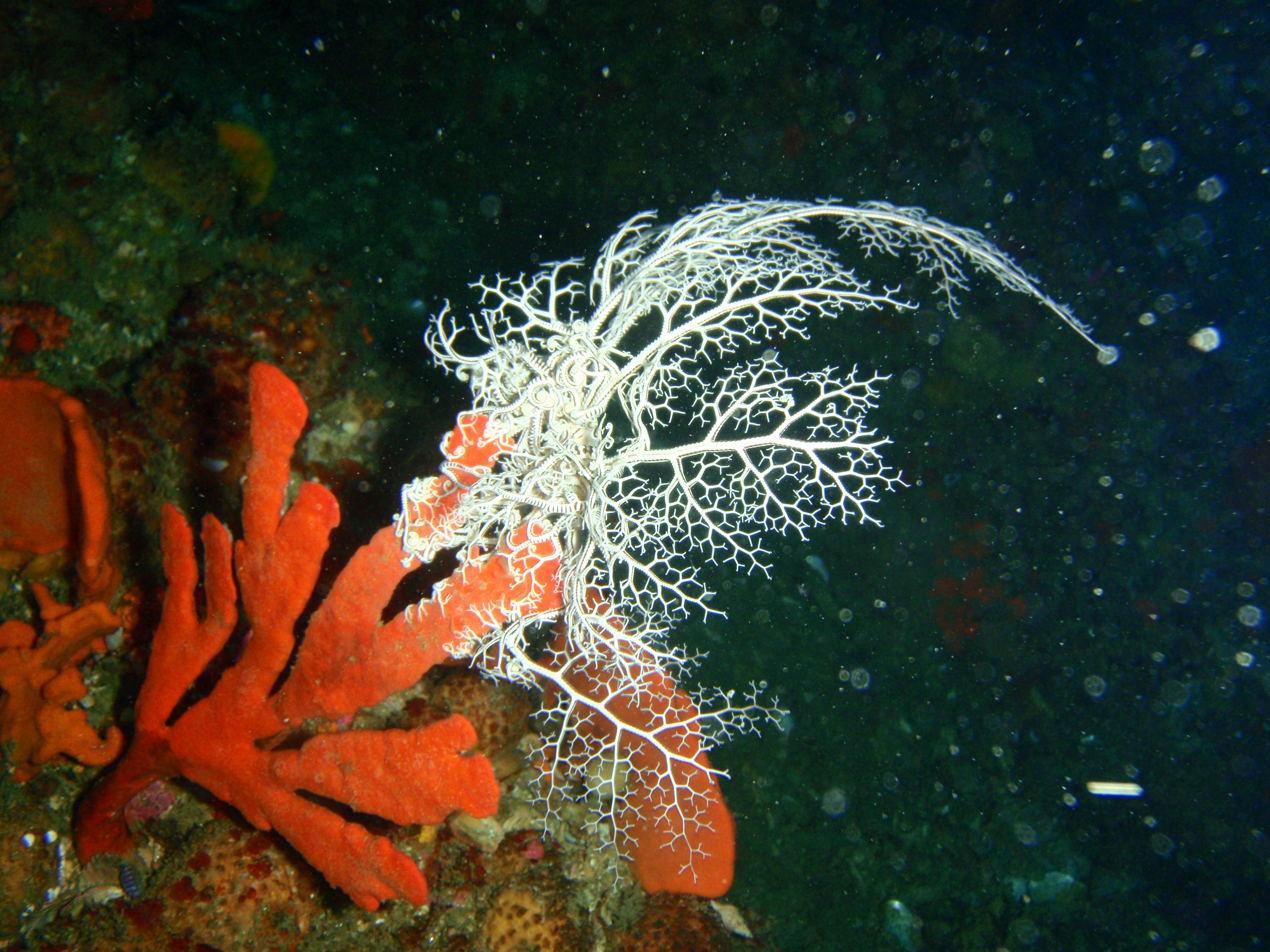
- Basket star open for feeding

Scientific classification
- Kingdom: Animalia
- Phylum: Echinodermata
- Class: Ophiuroidea
- Order: Phrynophiurida
- Family: Gorgonocephalidae
- Genus: Astrocladus
- Species: A. euryale

Binomial name
- Astrocladus euryale (Retzius 1783)

Synonyms
- Asterias euryale Retzius, 1783

= Astrocladus euryale =

Species of brittlestar

Astrocladus euryale, the basket star, or gorgon's head is a brittlestar of the family Gorgonocephalidae found in the coastal waters of South Africa from the west coast of the Cape Peninsula to about Algoa Bay.

== Description ==
The 10 arms branch repeatedly in an alternating pattern into ever-finer tendrils, which can be extended to form a basket-like net for filter feeding, or rolled up compactly against the body disc when not feeding. The body is generally a pale grey studded with whitish knobs usually ringed with black. The pattern varies, and the colours can vary regionally. The arms are usually white to pale grey with black stripes. Disc can be up to about 200mm diameter with extended arms up to 500mm long, Often found on high points of a reef or up on sea fans, noble corals or sponges when feeding. Found on reefs from below about 10m to about 90m.

Originally described as Asterias euryale by A. J. Retzius, in Anmärkningar vid. Asteriae genus. Kungliga Svenska Vetenskapsakademiens handlingar. Volume 4, pages 230–248, (1783)

== Gallery ==
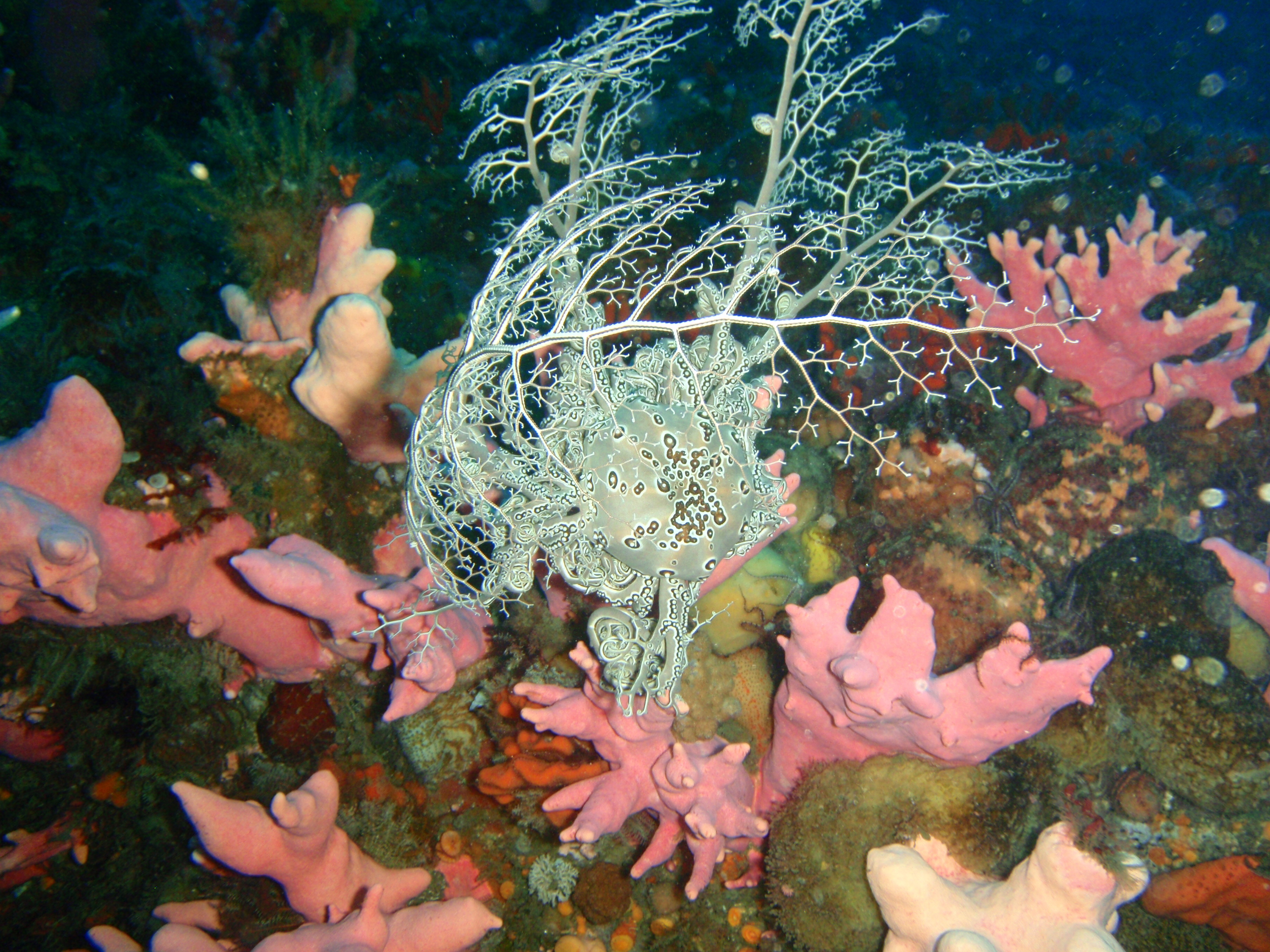
Basket star Astrocladus euryale at Tafelberg Deep reef off the west side of the Cape Peninsula

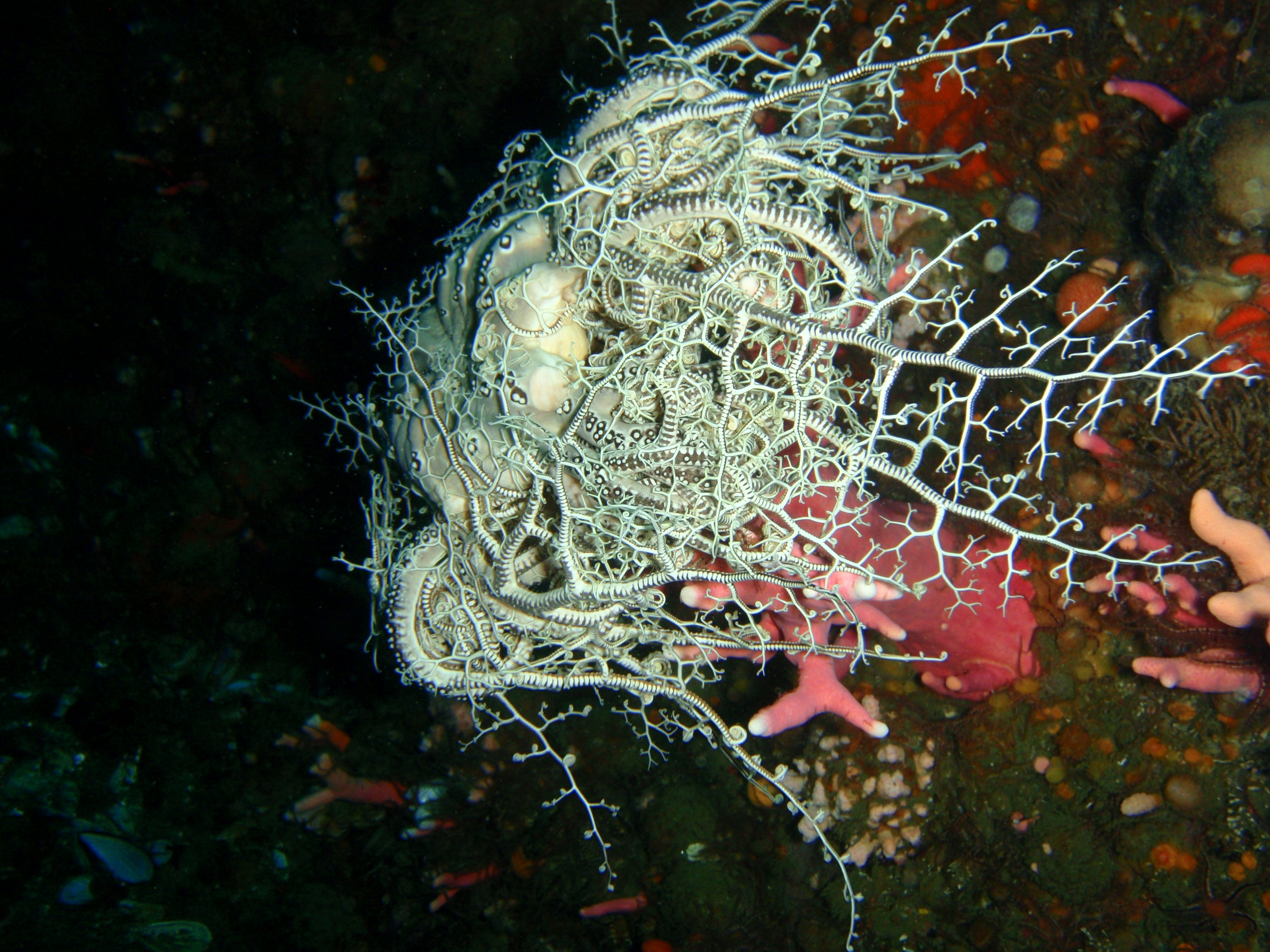
Basket star Astrocladus euryale at Tafelberg Deep reef

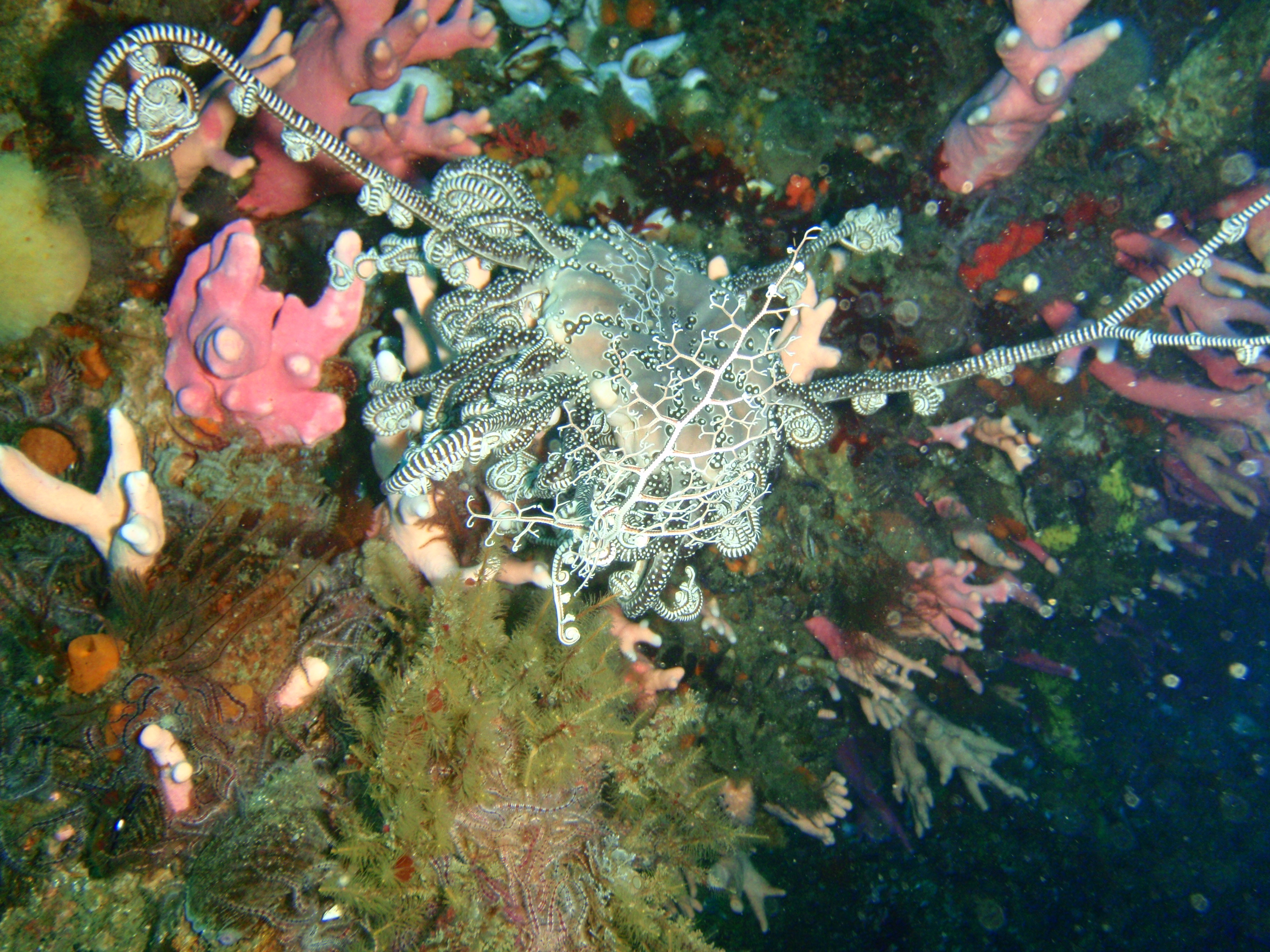
Basket star Astrocladus euryale at Tafelberg Deep reef

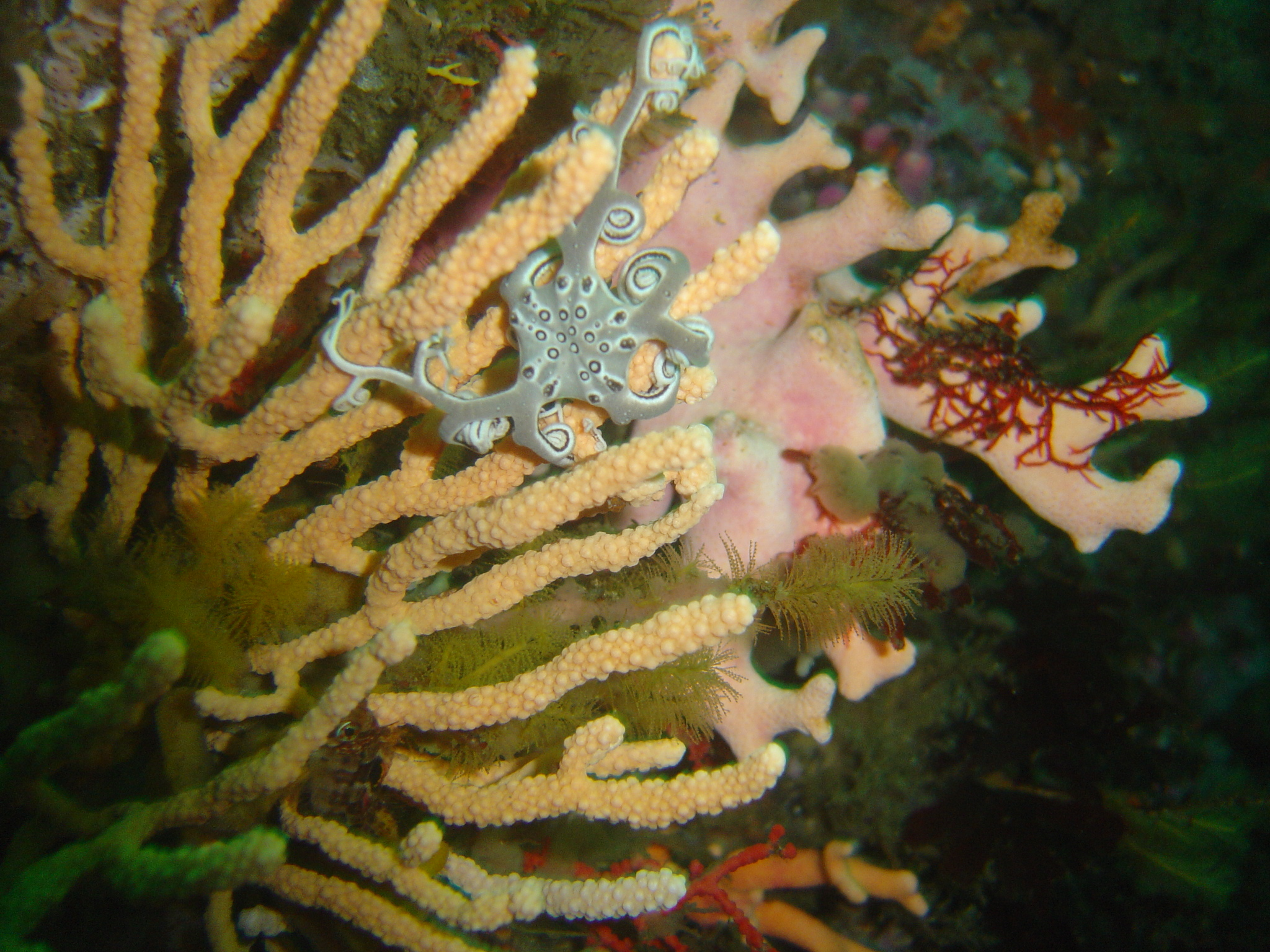
Small basket star on a nippled sea fan at Star Wall off the west side of the Cape Peninsula

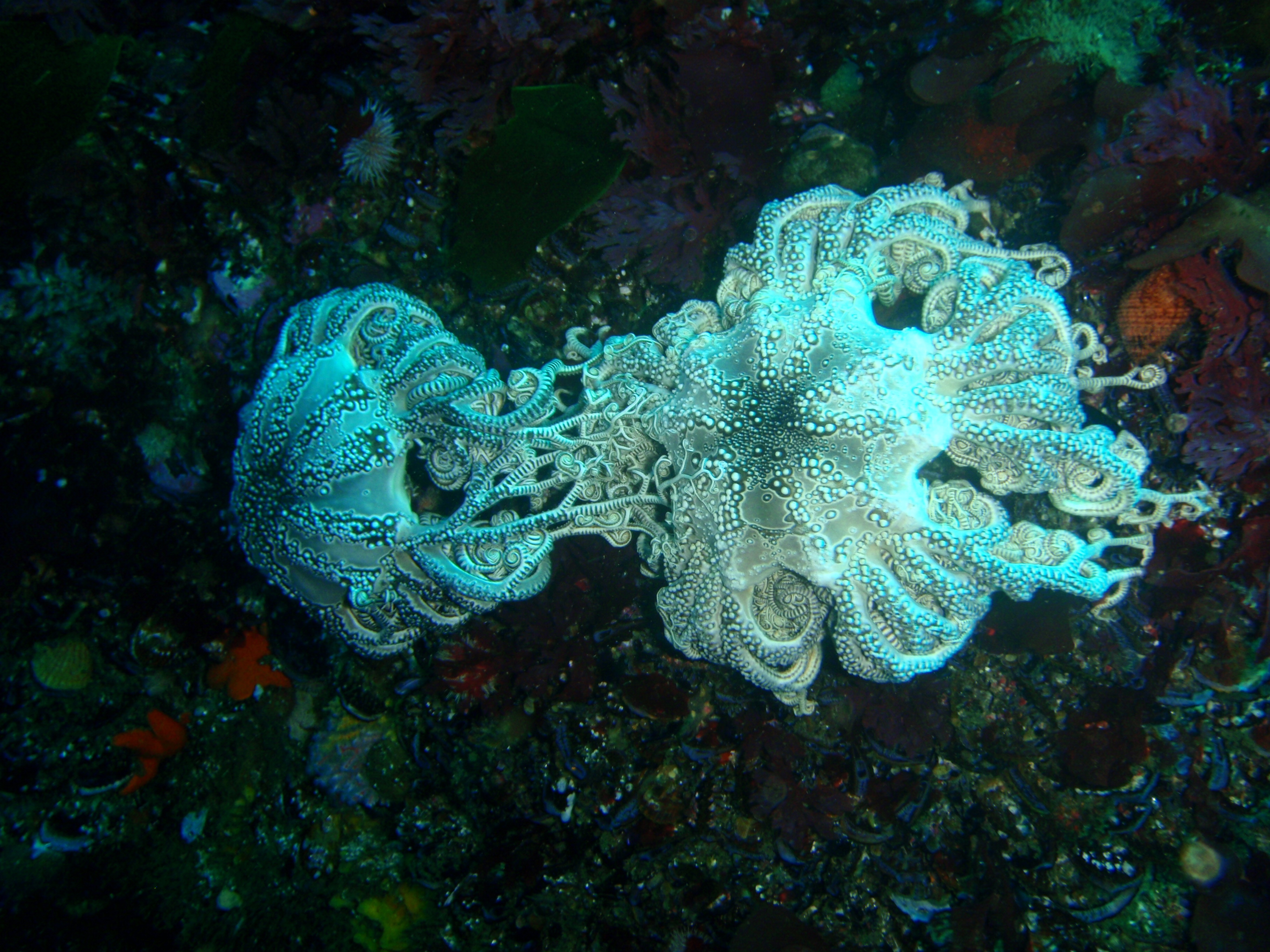
Pair of basket stars at Star Wall

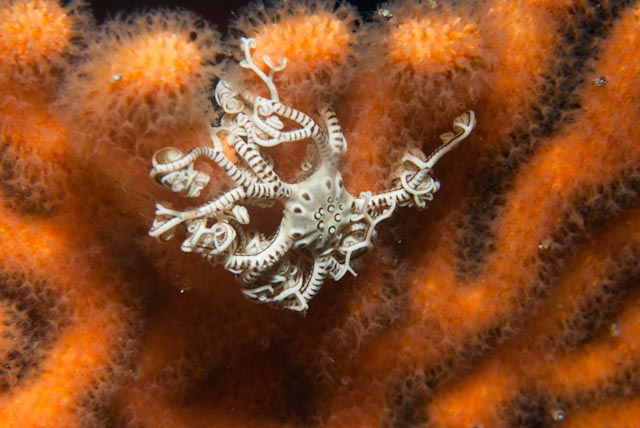
A juvenile basket star, Astrocladus euryale on a sinuous seafan, Eunicella tricoronata in 27m of water at Atantis Reef, on the west side of False Bay

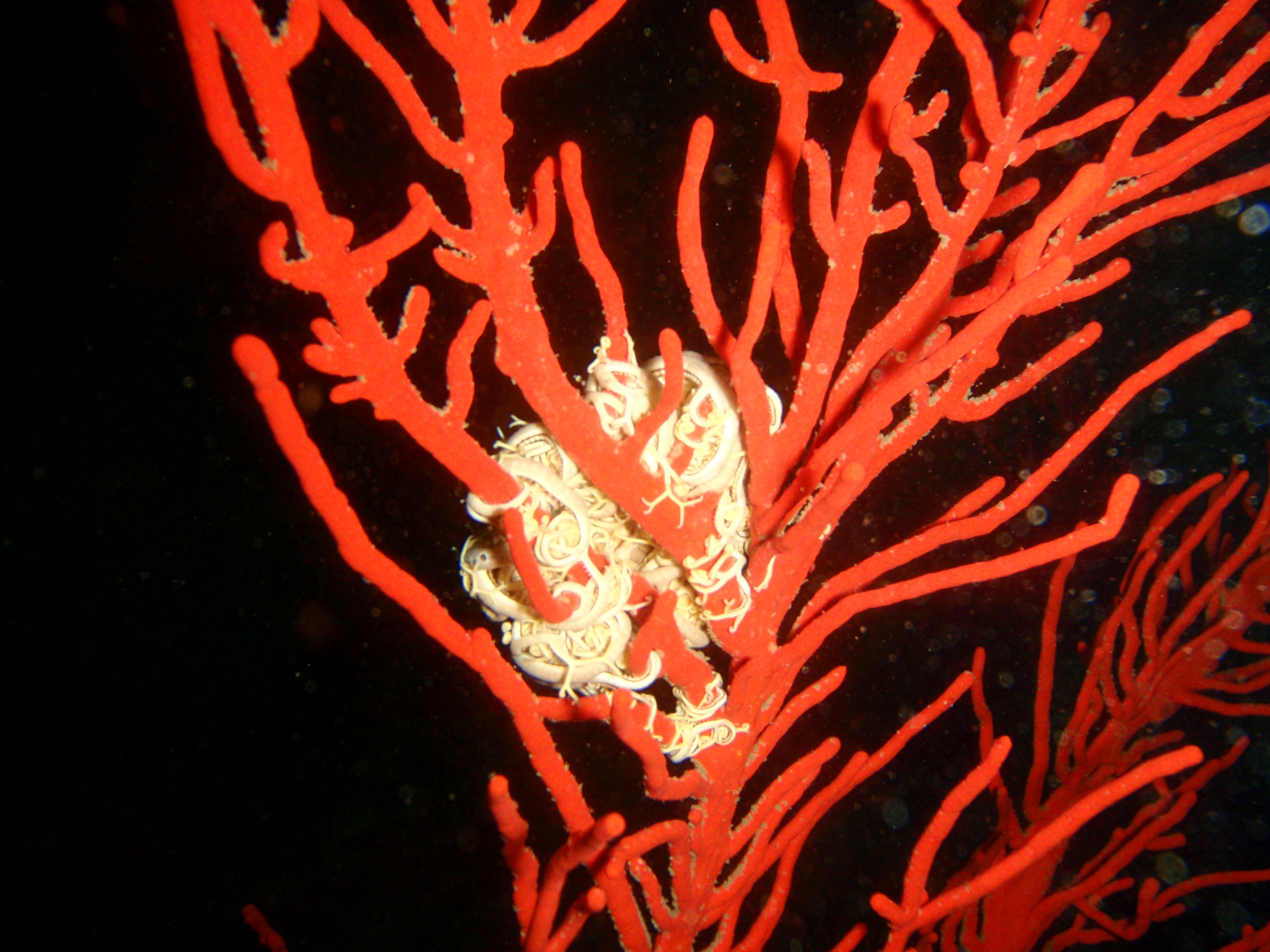
Sea fan with basket star at Finlay's Deep, on the weat side of False Bay.

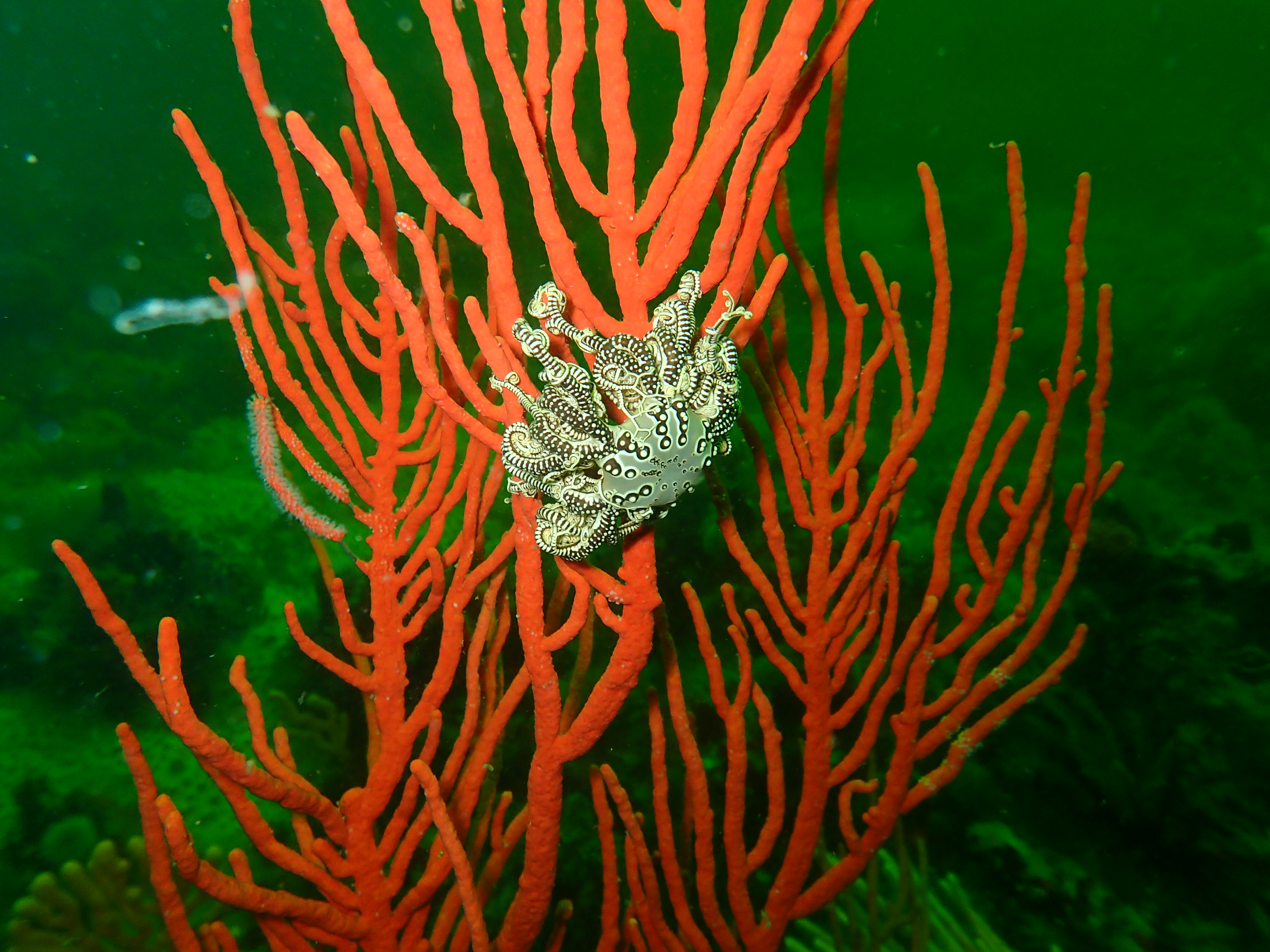
Basket star Astrocladus euryale at the Drop Zone in north eastern False Bay

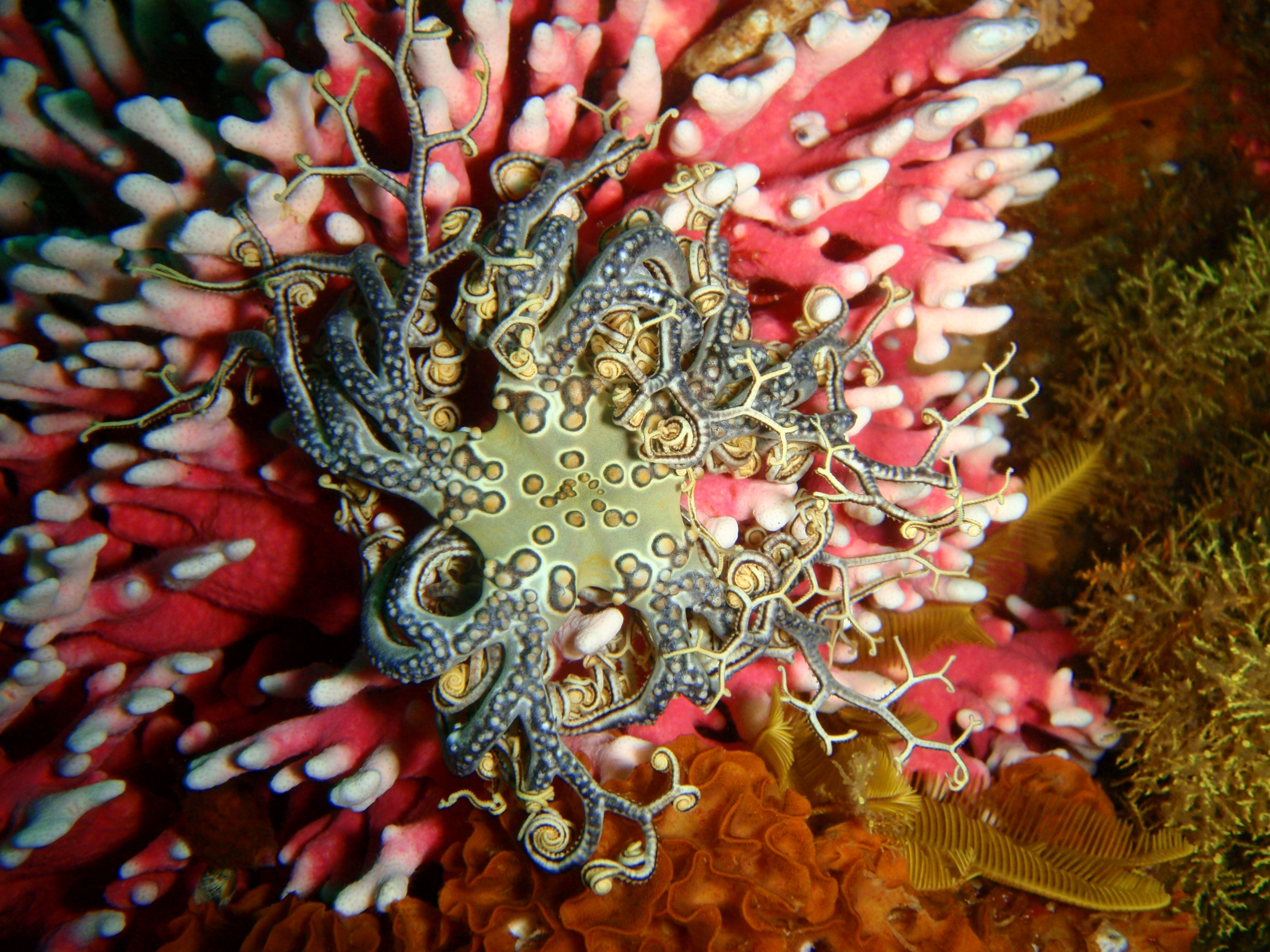
Basket star on noble coral at Middle Bank, Tsistikamma National Park MPA
