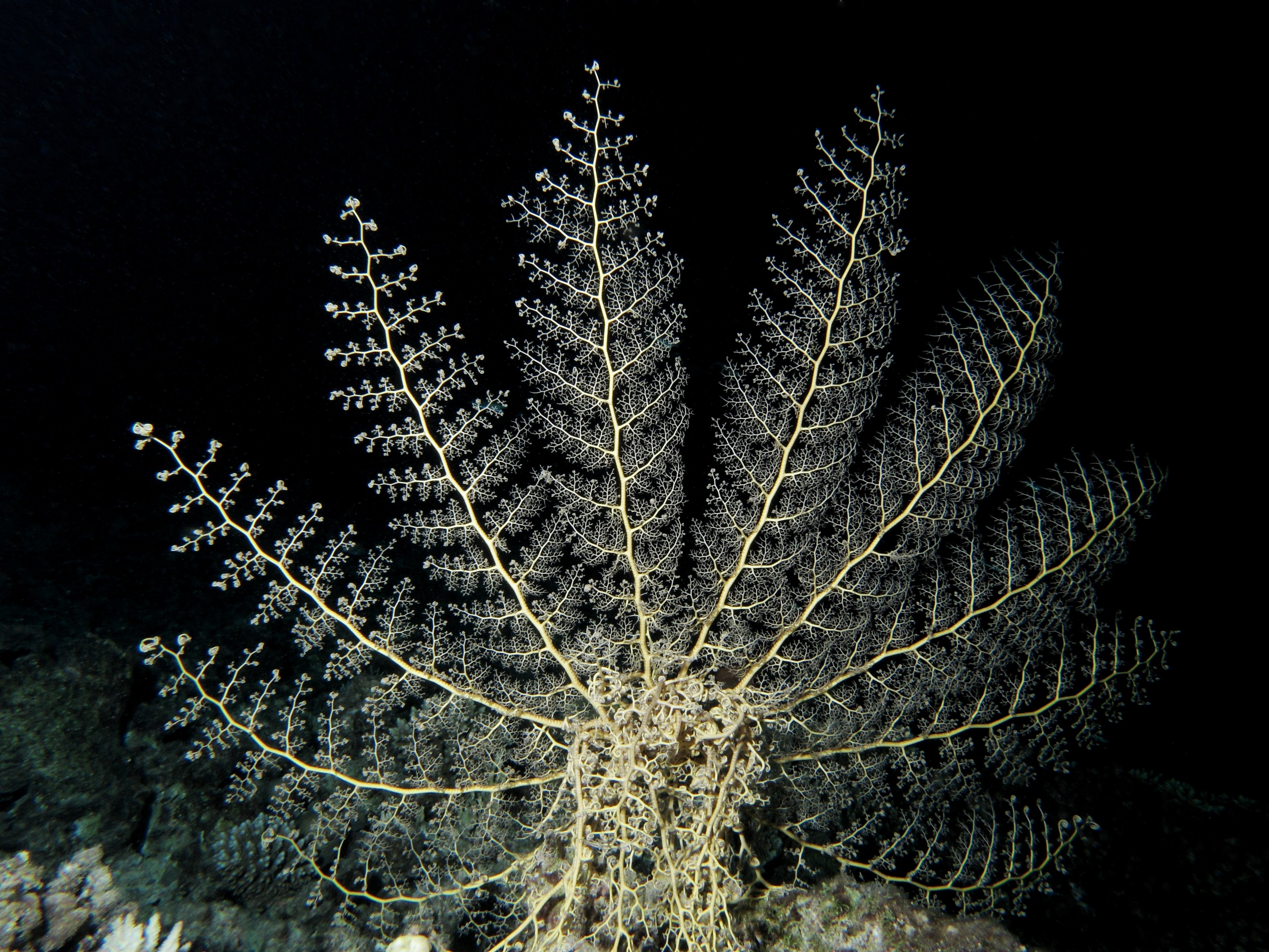
- Astroboa nuda

Scientific classification
- Kingdom: Animalia
- Phylum: Echinodermata
- Class: Ophiuroidea
- Order: Euryalida
- Family: Gorgonocephalidae
- Subfamily: Gorgonocephalinae
- Genus: Astroboa; Döderlein, 1911

Species
- See text

= Astroboa =

Genus of brittle stars

Astroboa is a genus of basket stars in the class Ophiuroidea.

== Species ==
These species are included in the genus by the World Register of Marine Species:

- Astroboa albatrossi Döderlein, 1927
- Astroboa arctos Matsumoto, 1915
- Astroboa clavata Lyman, 1861
- Astroboa ernae Döderlein, 1911
- Astroboa globifera Döderlein, 1902
- Astroboa granulatus H.L. Clark, 1938
- Astroboa nigrofurcata Döderlein, 1927
- Astroboa nuda Lyman, 1874
- Astroboa tuberculosa Koehler, 1930
