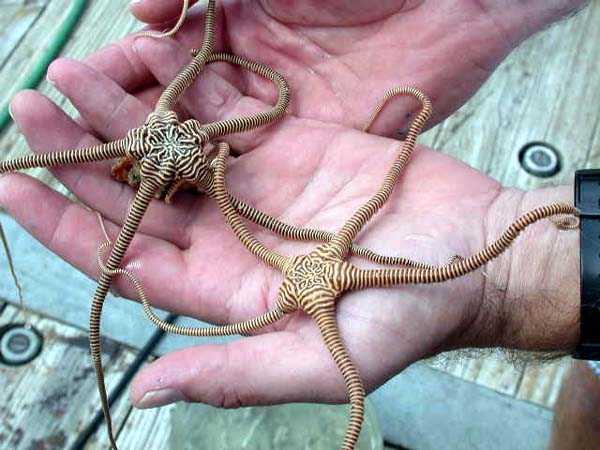

Scientific classification
- Kingdom: Animalia
- Phylum: Echinodermata
- Class: Ophiuroidea
- Order: Euryalida
- Family: Gorgonocephalidae
- Subfamily: Gorgonocephalinae
- Genus: Asteroporpa; Örsted & Lütken, 1856

= Asteroporpa =

Genus of brittle stars

Asteroporpa accepted name: Asteroporpa (Asteroporpa) is a genus of brittle stars belonging to the family Gorgonocephalidae.

The species of this genus are found in Central Atlantic Ocean and Pacific Ocean. Species:

- Asteroporpa annulata Örsted & Lütken, 1856
- Asteroporpa australiensis Clark, 1909
- Asteroporpa bellator (Koehler, 1904)
- Asteroporpa hadracantha Clark, 1911
- Asteroporpa indicus Baker, 1980
- Asteroporpa koyoae Okanishi & Fujita, 2011
- Asteroporpa lindneri Clark, 1948
- Asteroporpa muricatopatella Okanishi & Fujita, 2011
- Asteroporpa paucidens (Mortensen, 1933)
- Asteroporpa pulchra Clark, 1915
- Asteroporpa reticulata Baker, 1980
