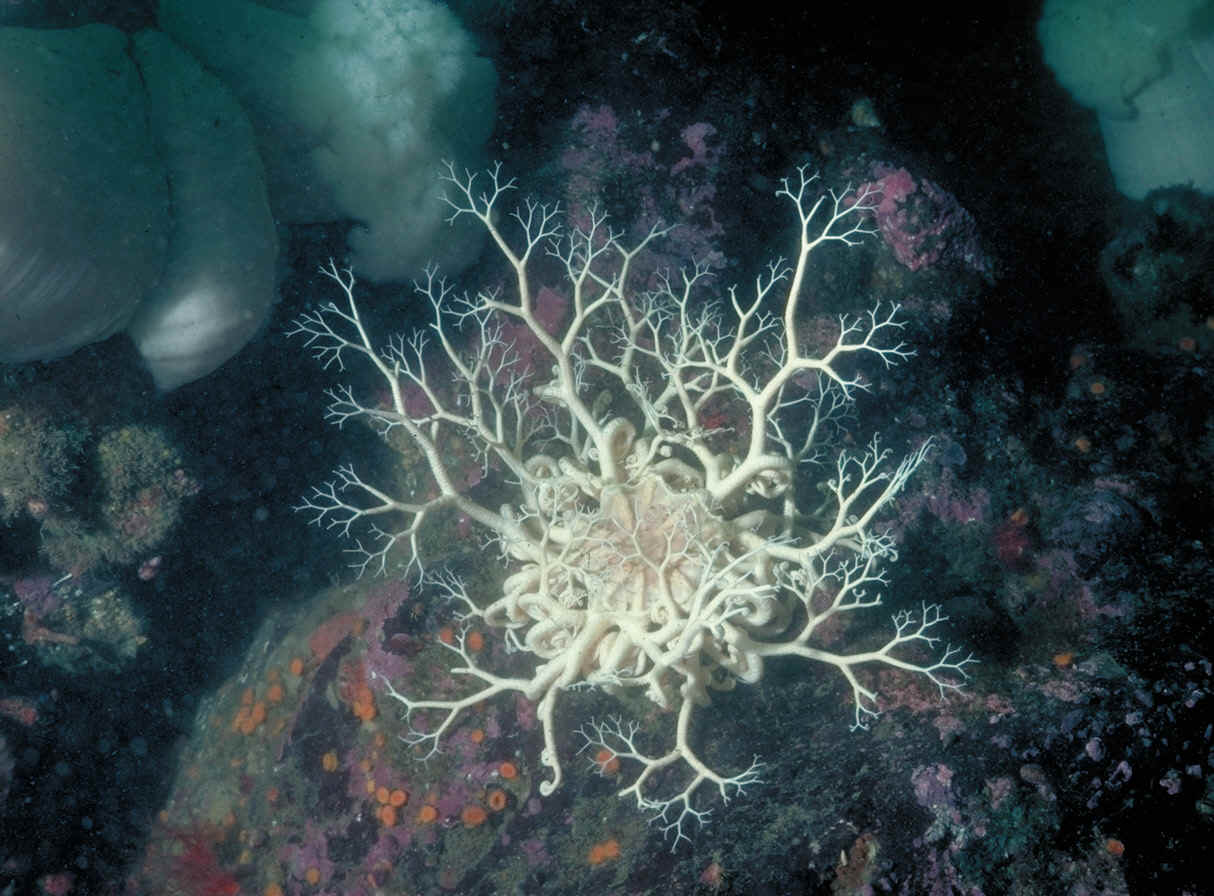

Scientific classification
- Kingdom: Animalia
- Phylum: Echinodermata
- Class: Ophiuroidea
- Order: Euryalida
- Family: Gorgonocephalidae
- Genus: Gorgonocephalus
- Species: G. eucnemis

Binomial name
- Gorgonocephalus eucnemis (Müller & Troschel, 1842)

Synonyms
- Astrophyton caryi Lyman, 1860; Astrophyton eucnemis Müller & Troschel, 1842; Astrophyton malmgreni Danielssen & Koren, 1877; Astrophyton stimpsoni Verrill, 1869; Gorgonocephalus caryi (Lyman, 1860); Gorgonocephalus japonicus Döderlein, 1902; Gorgonocephalus malmgreni (Danielssen & Koren, 1877); Gorgonocephalus stimpsoni (Verrill, 1869)

= Gorgonocephalus eucnemis =

Species of brittle star

Gorgonocephalus eucnemis is a species of basket star in the class Ophiuroidea. It is found in circumpolar marine environments in the Northern Hemisphere. The scientific name for the genus comes from the Greek, gorgós meaning "dreadful" and cephalus meaning "head", and refers to the similarity between these basket stars and the Gorgon's head from Greek mythology with its writhing serpents for hair. The specific name eucnemis is from the Greek "good" and "boot".

== Description ==
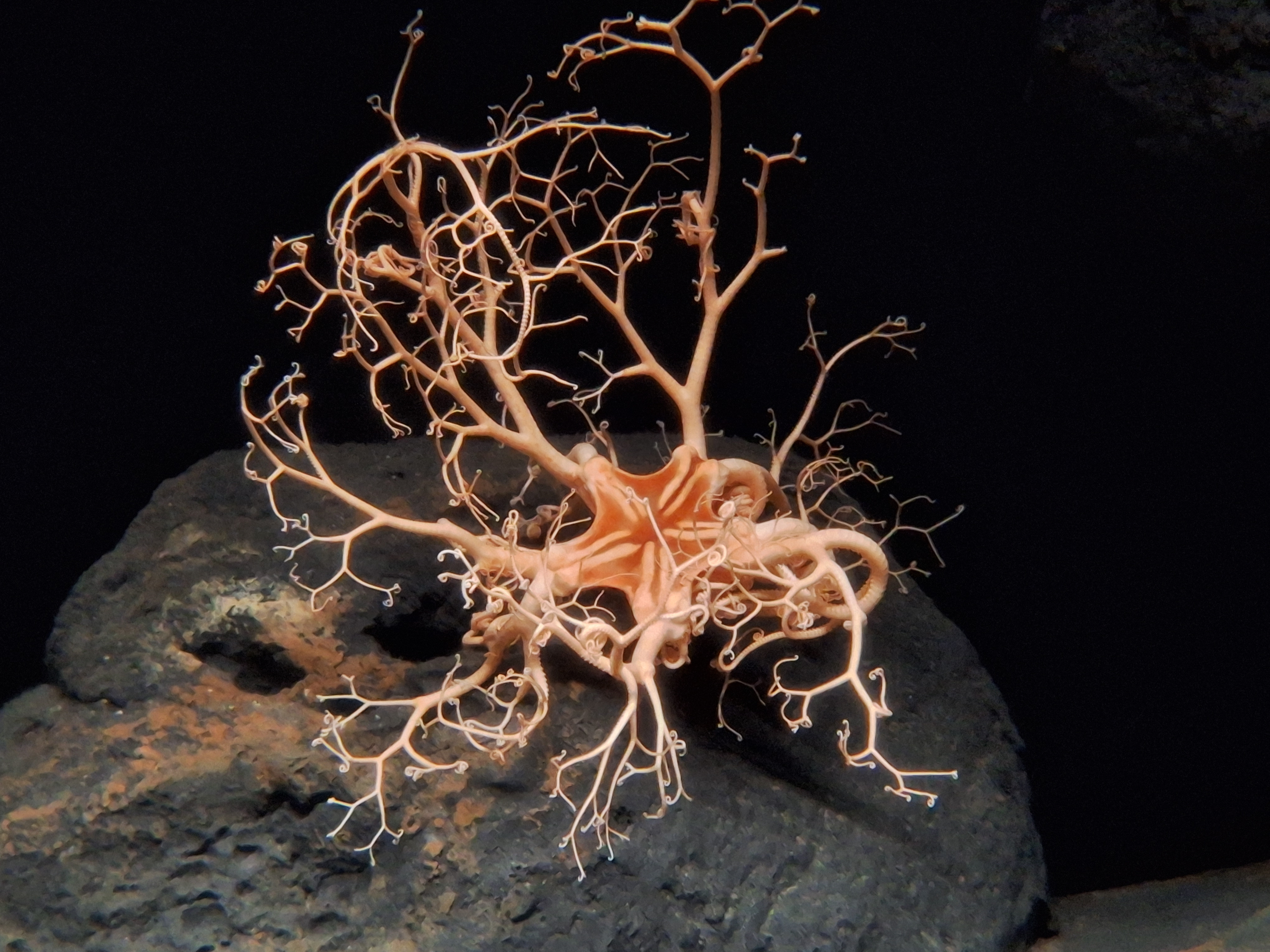
Gorgonocephalus eucnemis

Gorgonocephalus eucnemis has a central disc up to 14 cm (5.5 in) across with five pairs of arms that branch dichotomously into smaller and smaller subdivisions. Its colour is varying shades of white and beige, often with a darker disc. It has an endoskeleton of calcified ossicles and is covered in a fleshy layer of skin giving it a rubbery appearance. The arms are covered in tiny hooks and spines which can be used to grip and manipulate food particles.

== Distribution and habitat ==
G. eucnemis is found in the Arctic Ocean and northern parts of the Atlantic Ocean as far south as the Faroe Islands and Massachusetts. It also occurs in the Pacific Ocean from the Bering Sea south to Japan and Laguna Beach, California. It is mostly found in rocky areas with strong currents at depths to 2,000 m (6,600 ft), but is most common at depths of 15 to 150 m (49 to 492 ft). It is also found on mud and sandy seabeds among boulders, sea pens, and sea fans.

== Biology ==
It feeds by perching in an elevated position and extending its arms in a net-like fashion perpendicular to the current. The branches and branchlets twist and coil, making it resemble an animated bush. It ensnares small crustaceans such as the northern krill (Meganyctiphanes norvegica), copepods, chaetognaths, jellyfish, and detritus that come within reach. Trapped prey becomes the centre of a "knot" where it is immobilised by the secretion of mucus. Further coiling of the branches brings the food to the mouth which is on the underside of the central disc. Here, the branchlets are passed through a comb-like structure which removes the food particles. There is no anus and any undigested fragments are expelled through the mouth.

Individual basket stars are either male or female. After spawning, the larvae become part of the plankton and disperse with the currents.

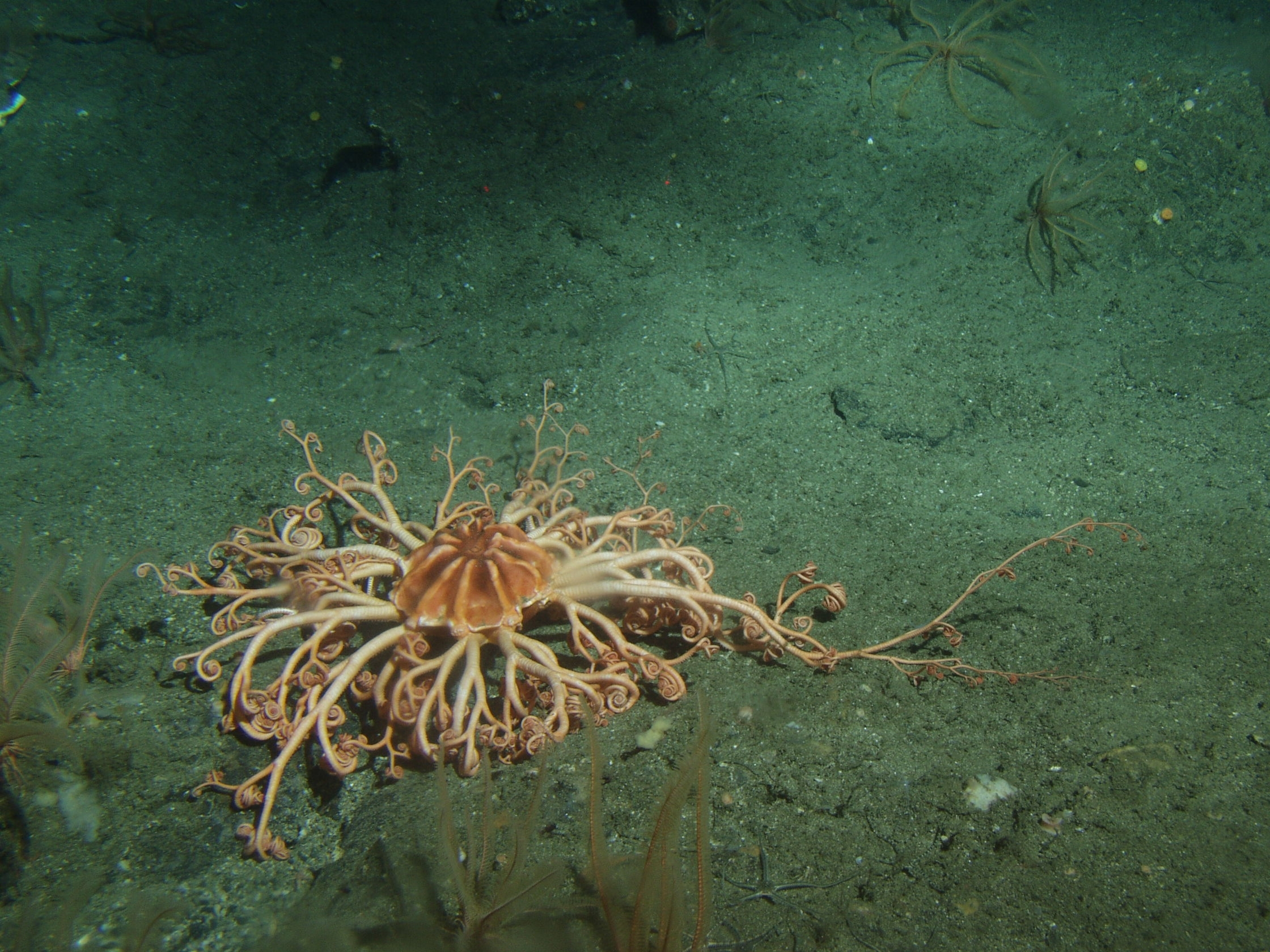

== Ecology ==
G. eucnemis is cryptic and remains well hidden during the day. It is protected by the toxic nature of the sponges where it lurks, but is sometimes eaten by fish and crabs. It has been observed to return to a specific location regularly.

It is often found living in association with sponges and soft corals in the genus Gersemia, hiding under them or in the folds of the sponges during the day and using them as elevated platforms for searching for prey at night. In Puget Sound, juveniles have been found to be living and apparently feeding inside the pharynges of Gersemia rubiformis polyps, only emerging when sufficiently grown to fend for themselves.
