= Asteronyx =

- Asteronyx loveni

Scientific classification
- Kingdom: Animalia
- Phylum: Echinodermata
- Class: Ophiuroidea
- Order: Euryalida
- Family: Asteronychidae
- Genus: Asteronyx; Müller & Troschel, 1842

Genus of brittle stars

Asteronyx is a genus of echinoderms belonging to the family Asteronychidae.

The genus has cosmopolitan distribution.

Species:

- Asteronyx longifissus Döderlein, 1927
- Asteronyx loveni Müller & Troschel, 1842
- Asteronyx luzonicus Döderlein, 1927
- Asteronyx lymani Verrill, 1899
- Asteronyx niger Djakonov, 1954
- Asteronyx reticulata Okanishi, Sentoku, Martynov & Fujita, 2018
- Asteronyx simplex A.H.Müller, 1950
- Asteronyx spinulosa Kutscher & Jagt, 2000
- Asteronyx valkenburgensis Berry, 1938
