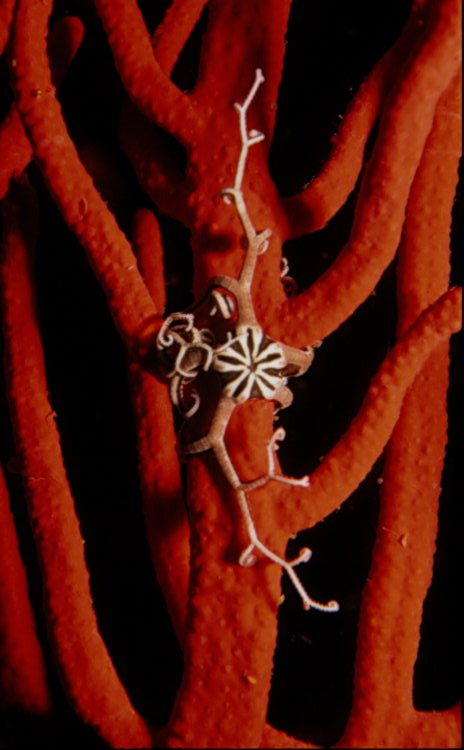
- Astrocladus euryale

Scientific classification
- Kingdom: Animalia
- Phylum: Echinodermata
- Class: Ophiuroidea
- Order: Euryalida
- Family: Gorgonocephalidae
- Subfamily: Gorgonocephalinae
- Genus: Astrocladus; Verrill, 1899

= Astrocladus =

Genus of brittle stars

Astrocladus is a genus of echinoderms belonging to the family Gorgonocephalidae.

The species of this genus are found in Southern Africa, Southeastern Asia and Australia.

Species:

- Astrocladus africanus Mortensen, 1933
- Astrocladus annulatus (Matsumoto, 1912)
- Astrocladus coniferus (Döderlein, 1902)
- Astrocladus dofleini Döderlein, 1910
- Astrocladus euryale (Retzius, 1783)
- Astrocladus exiguus (Lamarck, 1816)
- Astrocladus goodingi Baker, Okanishi & Pawson, 2018
- Astrocladus hirtus Mortensen, 1933
- Astrocladus ludwigi (Döderlein, 1896)
- Astrocladus pardalis (Döderlein, 1902)
- Astrocladus socotrana Baker, Okanishi & Pawson, 2018
- Astrocladus tonganus Döderlein, 1911
