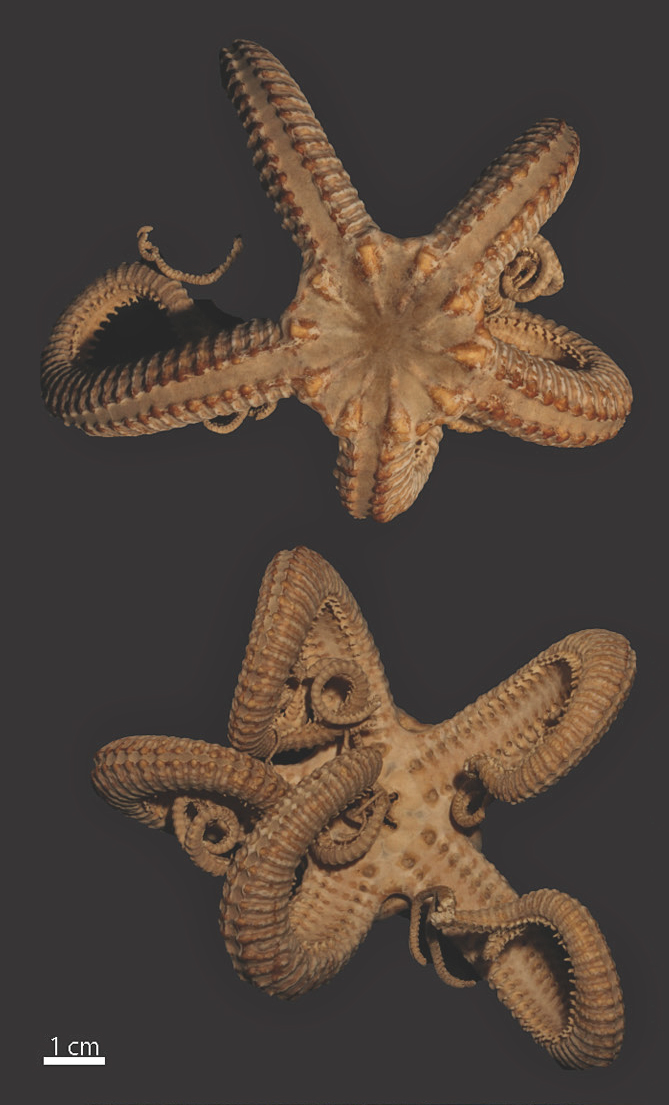
- Trichaster flagellifer

Scientific classification
- Kingdom: Animalia
- Phylum: Echinodermata
- Class: Ophiuroidea
- Order: Euryalida
- Family: Euryalidae
- Genus: Trichaster; L. Agassiz, 1836

= Trichaster =

Genus of marine invertebrates

Trichaster is a genus of echinoderms belonging to the family Euryalidae.

Species:

- Trichaster acanthifer Döderlein, 1927
- Trichaster flagellifer von Martens, 1866
- † Trichaster ornatus (Rasmussen, 1950)
- Trichaster palmiferus (Lamarck, 1816)
