= Phrynophiurida =

Scientific classification
- Kingdom: Animalia
- Phylum: Echinodermata
- Class: Ophiuroidea
- Order: Phrynophiurida; Matsumoto, 1915

Order of brittle stars

Phrynophiurida was an order of brittle stars containing basket stars which is no longer accepted following systematic revision of taxonomy of brittle stars. Basket stars are now placed in their own order of Euryalida.

== Taxonomy ==
Phrynophiurida contained the families Asteronychidae, Asteroschematidae, Gorgonocephalidae and Ophiomyxidae.

Asteronychidae and Gorgonocephalidae are now placed in the order Euryalida. Asteroschematidae is now accepted as Euryalidae. Ophiomyxidae has been moved to the order Ophiacanthida.
