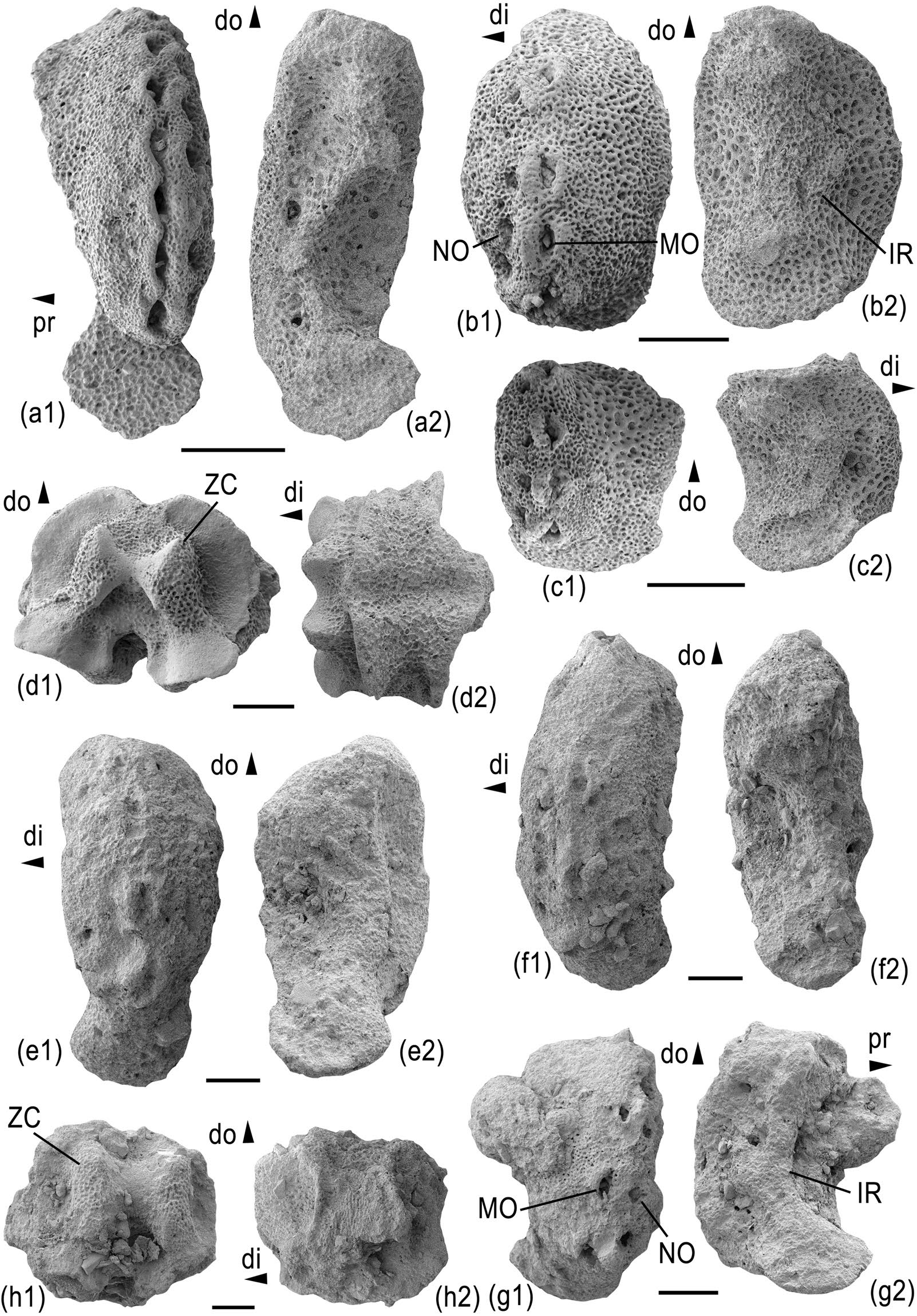

Scientific classification
- Kingdom: Animalia
- Phylum: Echinodermata
- Class: Ophiuroidea
- Order: Euryalida
- Genus: †Melusinaster; Thuy & Stöhr, 2018

Type species
- †Melusinaster alissawhitegluzae Thuy & Stöhr, 2018

Species
- †M. alissawhitegluzae; †M. arcusinimus

= Melusinaster =

Melusinaster Temporal range: Jurassic

Extinct genus of basket stars

Melusinaster is an extinct genus of basket stars from the Jurassic period described by Thuy and Stöhr in 2018. Fossil specimens from areas throughout Germany were used to describe the genus. The individuals described with small ophiuroids with arched, crescent-shaped arm plates, articulations in the spine made of muscle and nerve openings, and no tubercles or spurs on the outer surfaces of the arm plates.

== Taxonomy ==
Prior to the discovery of Melusinaster, the connection between basket stars and the larger group of brittle stars was ambiguous. The analyzed fossils were microscopic parts of skeletal remains retrieved from clay washed through sieves. The fossil remains represented a transitional form between the brittle stars and basket stars. Based on the morphology-based phylogenetic assessment by Thuy and Stöhr, Melusinaster is related to the previously described genus Aspiduriella, from the Triassic period, and is believed to be an intermediate genus between the older Aspiduriella and basket stars alive today.

== Etymology ==
The genus name refers to the legend of Melusine, a prominent part of the mythology of the House of Luxembourg, who claimed that their ancestor, Sigfried, Count of the Ardennes and the founder of Luxembourg City, married Melusine, only to discover she was a mermaid.

== Species ==
Only two species have been described in Melusinaster: M. alissawhitegluzae, named after singer Alissa White-Gluz of the Swedish extreme metal band Arch Enemy, and M. arcusinimus, named for the Latinized version of 'Arch Enemy'. A replica of a basket star was given to White-Gluz during a concert at Rockhal in 2018. Another replica is housed in the National Museum of Natural History in Luxembourg.
