= Asteronychidae =

Asteronychidae Temporal range: 93.9–0 Ma Late Cretaceous to Present
- Astrodia tenuispina

Scientific classification
- Kingdom: Animalia
- Phylum: Echinodermata
- Class: Ophiuroidea
- Order: Euryalida
- Family: Asteronychidae; Ljungman, 1867

Type genus
- Asteronyx; Müller & Troschel, 1842

Genera
- 5, see text

Family of brittle stars

Asteronychidae is a family of echinoderms belonging to the order Euryalida. The earliest fossils from this family date back to the Turonian in the Late Cretaceous.

== Taxonomy ==
The phylogenetic tree per O'Hara et al. (2017) is as follows.

- Euryalida
  - - Gorgonocephalidae
    - Euryalidae
  - Asteronychidae

The family has following genera:

- Asteronyx Müller & Troschel, 1842
- Astrodia Verrill, 1899
- Astronebris Downey, 1967
- Lillithaster† Thuy, Numberger-Thuy & Jagt, 2018
- Ophioschiza H.L. Clark, 1911
