= Lichomolgidae =

Scientific classification
- Kingdom: Animalia
- Phylum: Arthropoda
- Clade: Pancrustacea
- Class: Copepoda
- Order: Cyclopoida
- Suborder: Ergasilida
- Family: Lichomolgidae

Family of crustaceans

Lichomolgidae is a family of copepods belonging to the order Cyclopoida.

== Genera ==
Genera:

- Ascidioxynus Humes & Stock, 1972
- Astericola Rosoll, 1888
- Boholia Kossmann, 1872
