= Euryalidae =

Euryalidae Temporal range: 83.6–0 Ma Late Cretaceous to Present
- Euryale aspera

Scientific classification
- Kingdom: Animalia
- Phylum: Echinodermata
- Class: Ophiuroidea
- Order: Euryalida
- Family: Euryalidae; Gray, 1840

Type genus
- Euryale; Lamarck, 1816

Genera
- 11, see text

Synonyms
- List: Asteroschematidae Verrill, 1899; Asteroschematinae Verrill, 1899 emended Okanishi et al., 2011; Astrocharidae Okanishi et al., 2011; Astrocharinae Okanishi et al., 2011; Euryalidea Gray, 1840; Euryalinae Gray, 1840, emended Okanishi et al., 2011; Trichasteridae Döderlein, 1911

Family of brittle stars

Euryalidae is a family of echinoderms belonging to the order Euryalida. Most of the fossils found from this family are from the genus Trichaster. The earliest fossil from this family (Trichaster ornatus†) dates back to the Campanian in the Late Cretaceous

== Taxonomy ==
The phylogenetic tree per O'Hara et al. (2017) is as follows.

- Euryalida
  - - Gorgonocephalidae
    - Euryalidae
  - Asteronychidae

There are eleven genera:

- Asteromorpha Lütken, 1869
- Asteroschema Örsted & Lütken, 1856
- Asterostegus Mortensen, 1933
- Astrobrachion Doederlein, 1927
- Astroceras Lyman, 1879
- Astrocharis Koehler, 1904
- Euryale Lamarck, 1816
- Ophiocreas Lyman, 1879
- Squamophis Okanishi, O'Hara & Fujita, 2011
- Sthenocephalus Koehler, 1898
- Trichaster L. Agassiz, 1836
