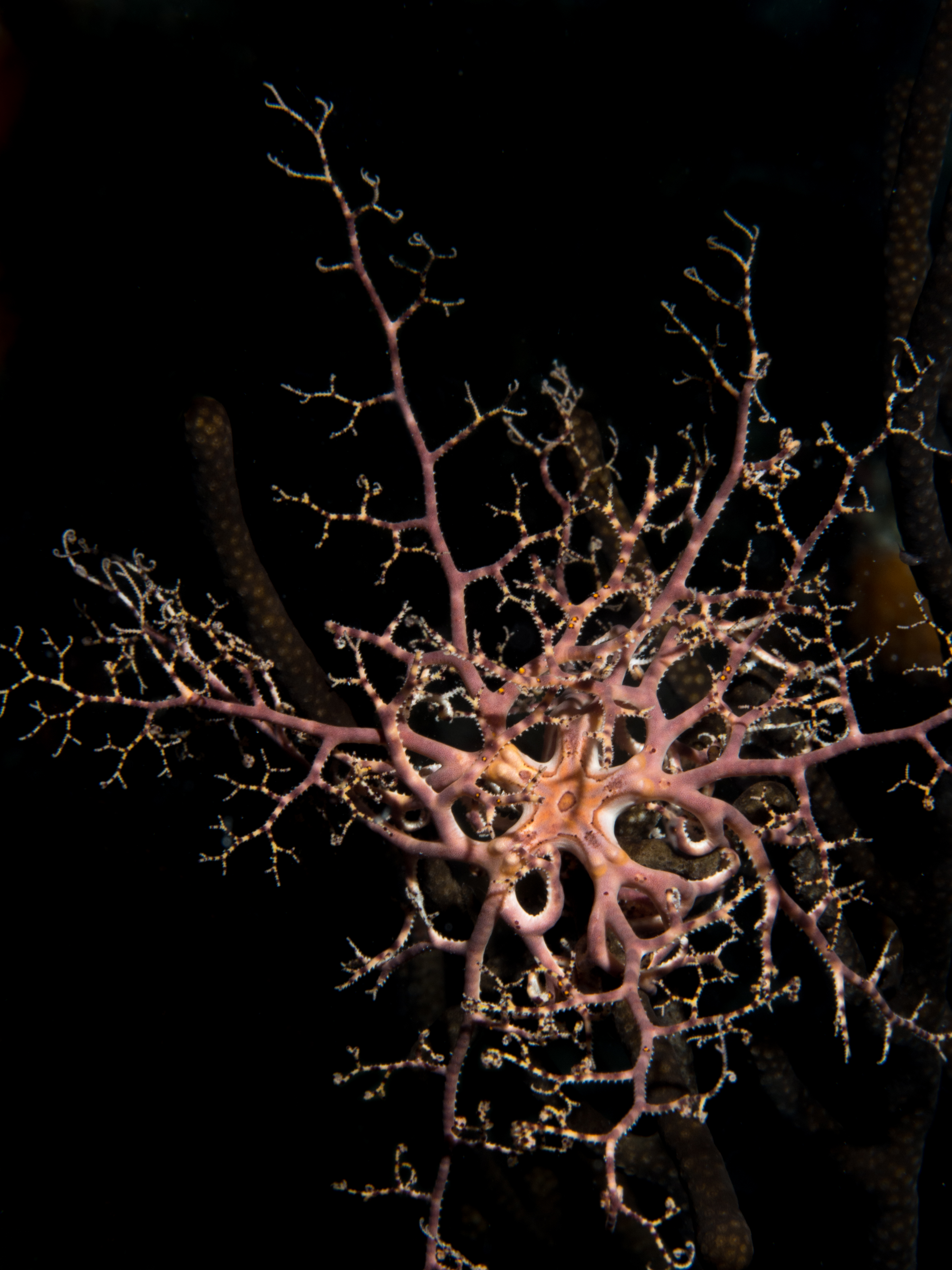

Scientific classification
- Kingdom: Animalia
- Phylum: Echinodermata
- Class: Ophiuroidea
- Order: Phrynophiurida
- Family: Gorgonocephalidae
- Subfamily: Gorgonocephalinae
- Genus: Astrophyton; Fleming, 1828
- Species: A. muricatum

Binomial name
- Astrophyton muricatum (Lamarck, 1816)

Synonyms
- Euryale muricatum Lamarck, 1816

= Astrophyton =

Genus of brittle stars

Astrophyton muricatum, the giant basket star, is an echinoderm found in shallow parts of the tropical western Atlantic and throughout the Caribbean Sea and the Gulf of Mexico. It is the only species in the genus Astrophyton. During the day, it curls up into a tight ball shape to protect itself from predators. At night, it climbs to an elevated point to feed by extending its intricately branched feeding arms in a bowl-like shape in order to snare passing plankton and other organisms from the current.

== Description ==
The giant basket star is a very large echinoderm that can reach a diameter of nearly a metre when its arms are fully extended. It has a central disc and eight slender, flexible arms that repeatedly divide to form a fine-meshed net-like structure. The colour is generally brown or black.

== Distribution and habitat ==
This basket star is found in warmer regions of the western Atlantic Ocean, the Caribbean Sea and Gulf of Mexico. Its range extends from Cape Lookout in North Carolina to the coast of Brazil at about 20°S. It is found at depths down to about 30 m (98 ft). Although it is usually found on coral reefs, it also occurs on the top of boulders or in seagrass meadows.

== Behaviour ==
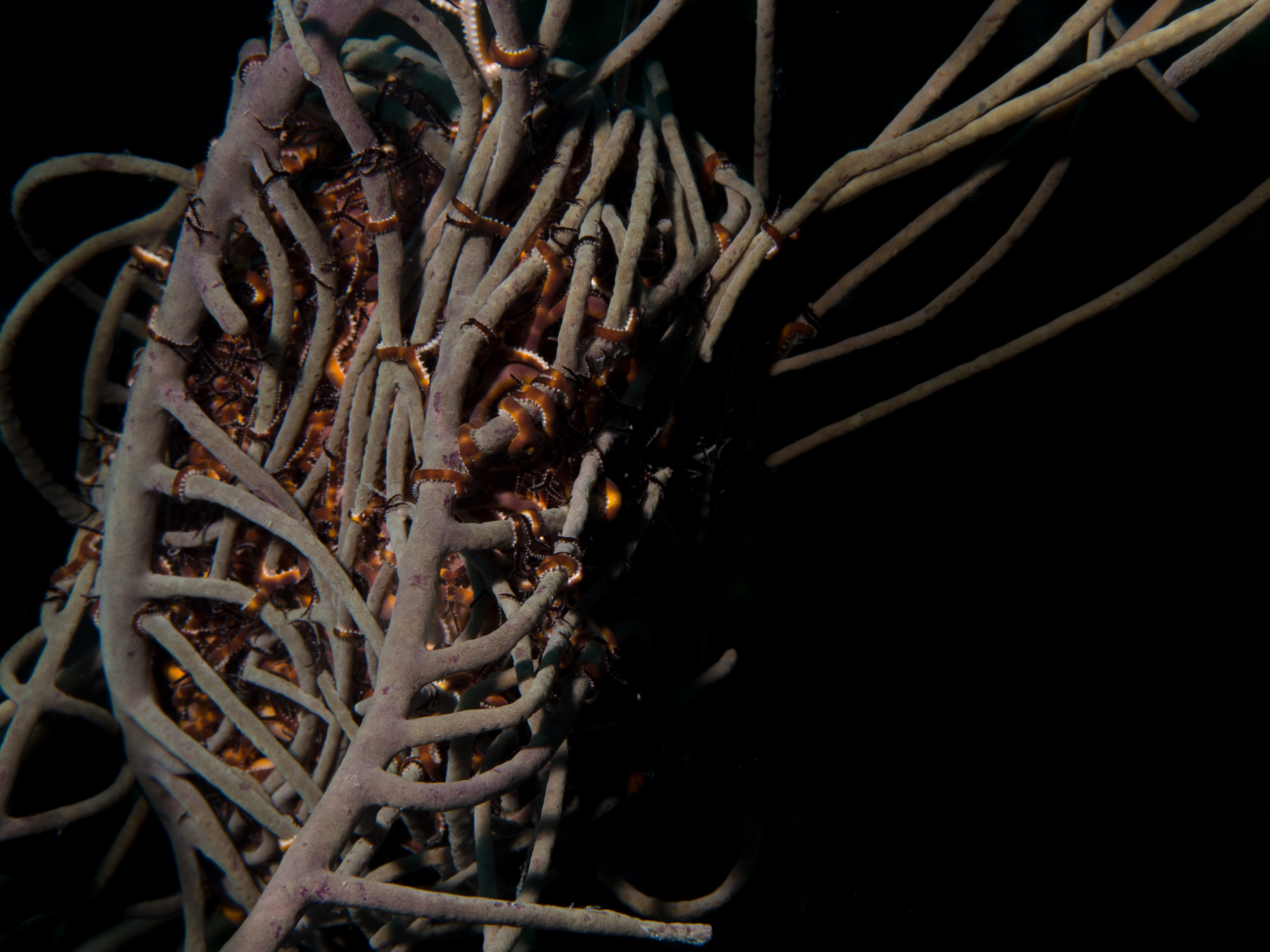
Astrophyton hiding during the day in the branches of a gorgonian at Atlantis dive site in Bonaire

The species is nocturnal and spends the day in a hiding place. It only feeds when the water conditions are optimal. When the current is too strong it keeps its arms folded up but at moderate current speed it climbs to an elevated position and spreads its arms wide. The arms are much branched and the mesh size is small, enabling it to capture a wide variety of prey. The part of the arms near their base overlap one another and may serve to create a degree of turbulence which may assist the outer parts of the arms in their food capture or bring further food particles within reach. When feeding, it orientates itself towards the current in order to maximise its food collection ability. When it touches a food particle, the smallest branches close around it to form a ball which is then moved to the mouth. Even small juvenile fishes, shrimps and similar-sized organisms can be captured by these means. Typical perches are on the top of large corals or the top of gorgonians, and it uses the lower parts of the arms to hold itself in place. During the day it retreats down to the base of the coral or gorgonian, or hides in a crevice in the structure during the day. If a light is shone on it while it is feeding at night, it curls itself up, taking several minutes to become a fist-sized structure.

The shrimp Periclimenes perryae often lives in association with the giant basket star, and larger individuals are usually coloured to match the colour of the basket star.
