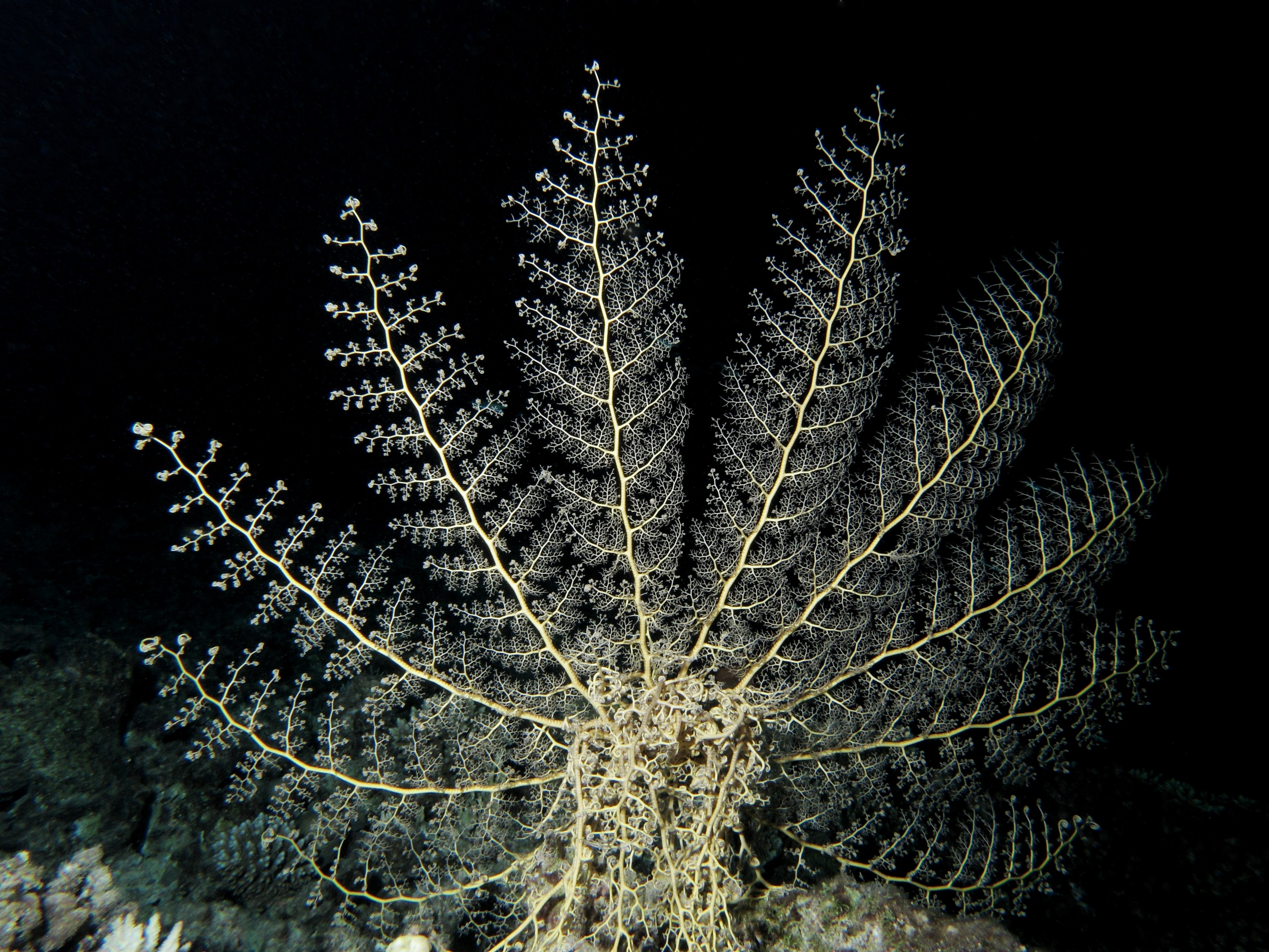
- Astroboa nuda

Scientific classification
- Kingdom: Animalia
- Phylum: Echinodermata
- Class: Ophiuroidea
- Order: Euryalida
- Family: Gorgonocephalidae; Ljungman, 1867

Type genus
- Gorgonocephalus; Leach, 1815

Genera
- 33, see text

Synonyms
- Astrochelidae Verrill, 1899

= Gorgonocephalidae =

Gorgonocephalidae Temporal range: 69–0 Ma Late Cretaceous to Present

Family of brittle stars

Gorgonocephalidae is a family of basket stars. They have characteristic many-branched arms. Gorgonocephalidae are the largest ophiuroids (Gorgonocephalus eucnemis can measure up to 70 cm in arm length with a disk diameter of 14 cm). WIth 33 genera, it is the largest family of basket stars.

The earliest fossil from this family dates back to the Late Maastrichtian in the Late Cretaceous. Fossils have also been found dating back to the Burdigalian in the Early Miocene and the Langhian in the Middle Miocene.

== Taxonomy ==
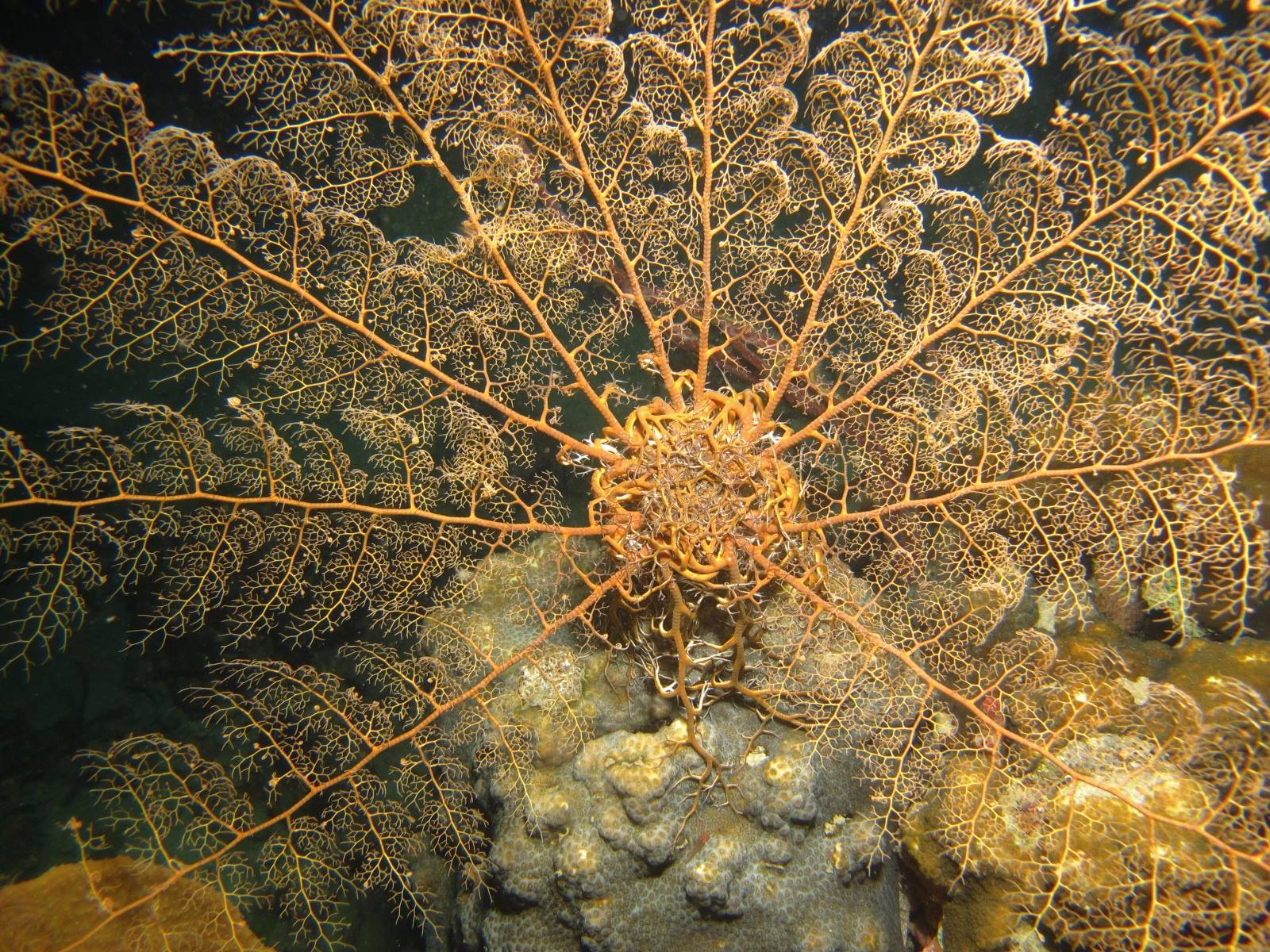
Astrophyton muricatum

Astrocladus euryale

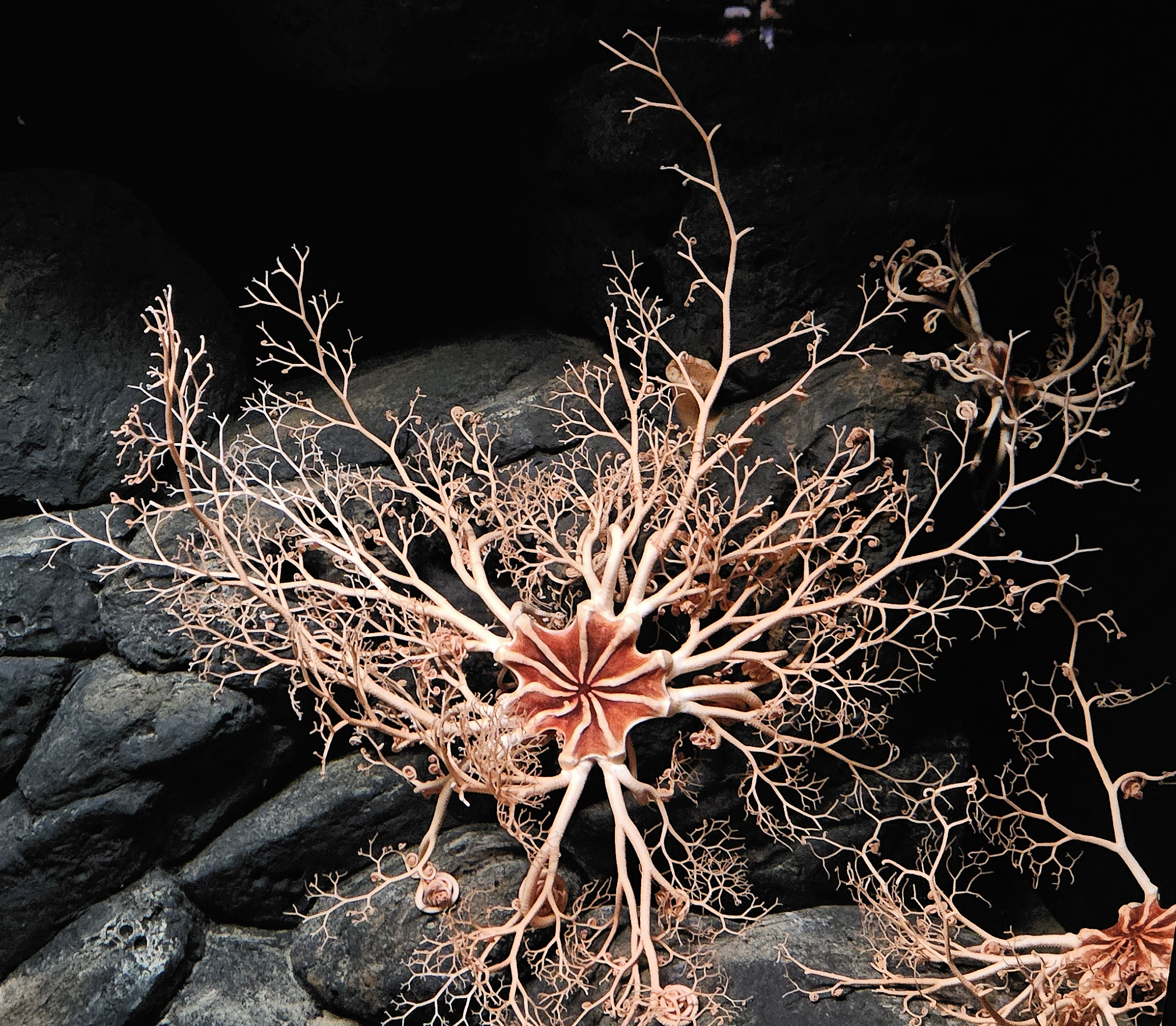
Gorgonocephalus eucnemis

The phylogenetic tree per O'Hara et al. (2017) is as follows.

- Euryalida
  - - Gorgonocephalidae
    - Euryalidae
  - Asteronychidae

The family is divided into the following genera:

- Subfamily Astrocloninae Okanishi & Fujita, 2018
  - Astroclon Lyman, 1879
- Subfamily Astrothamninae Okanishi & Fujita, 2013
  - Astrothamnus Matsumoto, 1915
  - Astrothrombus H.L. Clark, 1909
- Subfamily Astrotominae Matsumoto, 1915
  - Astracme Döderlein, 1927
  - Astrocrius Döderlein, 1927
  - Astrohamma Döderlein, 1930
  - Astrotoma Lyman, 1875
- Subfamily Gorgonocephalinae Döderlein, 1911
  - Asteroporpa Örsted & Lütken in: Lütken, 1856
  - Astroboa Döderlein, 1911
  - Astrocaneum Döderlein, 1911
  - Astrochalcis Koehler, 1905
  - Astrochele Verrill, 1878
  - Astrochlamys Koehler, 1912
  - Astrocladus Verrill, 1899
  - Astrocnida Lyman, 1872
  - Astrocyclus Döderlein, 1927
  - Astrodendrum Döderlein, 1911
  - Astrodictyum Döderlein, 1927
  - Astroglymma Döderlein, 1927
  - Astrogomphus Lyman, 1870
  - Astrogordius Döderlein, 1911
  - Astroniwa McKnight, 2000
  - Astrophyton Fleming, 1828
  - Astroplegma Döderlein, 1927
  - Astrosierra Baker, 1980
  - Astrospartus Döderlein, 1911
  - Astrothorax Döderlein, 1911
  - Astrozona Döderlein, 1930
  - Conocladus H.L. Clark, 1909
  - Gorgonocephalus Leach, 1815
  - Ophiocrene Bell, 1894
  - Ophiozeta Koehler, 1930
  - Schizostella A.H. Clark, 1952
