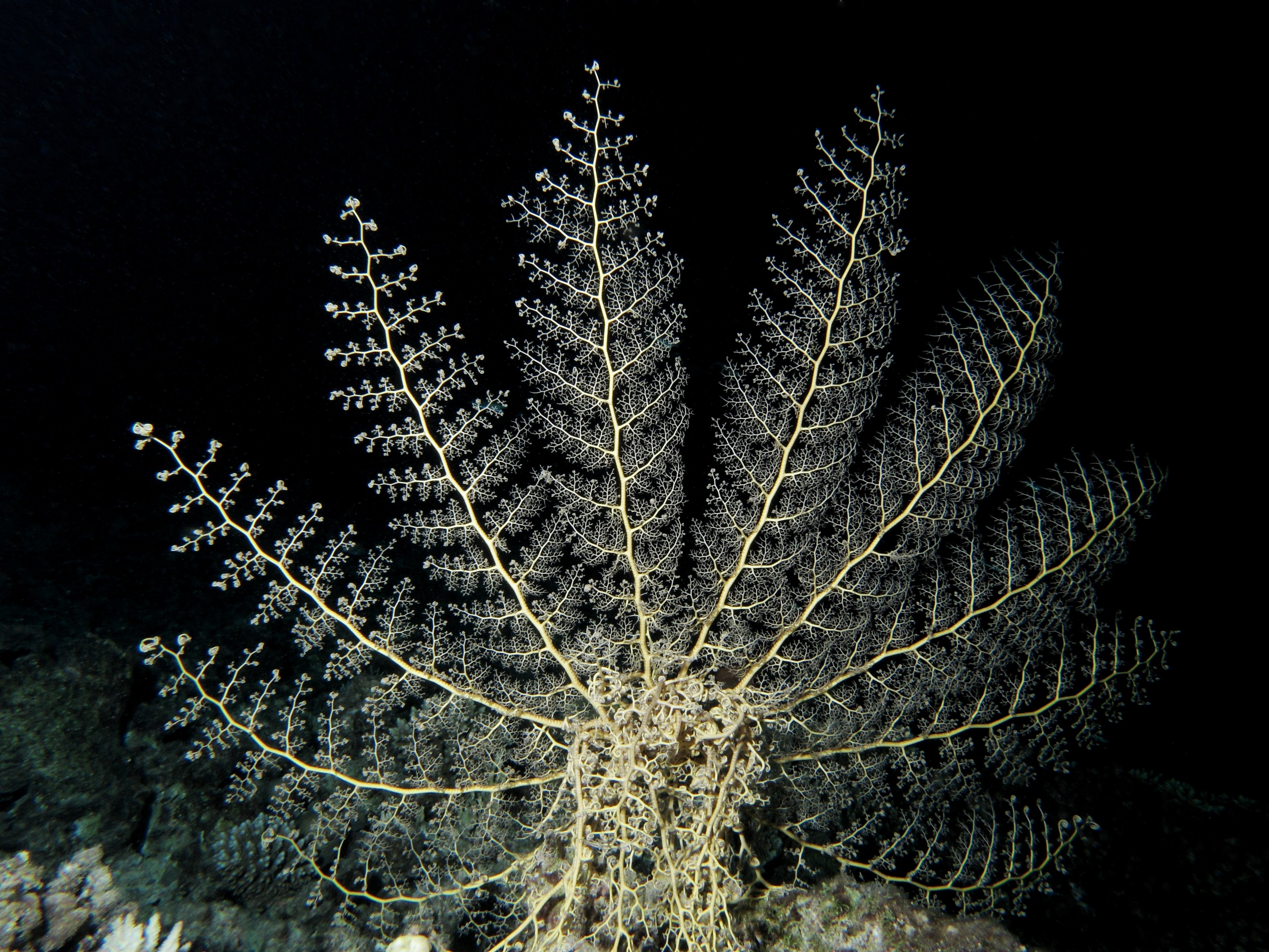
- Astroboa nuda basket star feeding at night in the Red Sea

Scientific classification
- Kingdom: Animalia
- Phylum: Echinodermata
- Class: Ophiuroidea
- Superorder: Euryophiurida
- Order: Euryalida; Lamarck, 1816

Families
- Aspiduriellidae†; Asteronychidae; Euryalidae; Gorgonocephalidae

Synonyms
- Euryalae Mortensen, 1927; Euryalina Müller & Troschel, 1840

= Basket star =

Basket star Temporal range: 237–0 Ma Late Triassic to Present

Suborder of brittle stars

The Euryalida, commonly known as basket stars, is an order of echinoderms belonging to the class Ophiuroidea. They are a type of brittle star with either branching arms (called "basket stars") or long and curling arms (called "snake stars"). It contains three extant families, Asteronychidae, Euryalidae and Gorgonocephalidae.

The earliest fossil from this order (Aspiduriella kusamae†) dates back to the Carnian in the Late Triassic. Fossil from genus Persoonaster† is known from the Hettangian in the Early Jurassic.

== Characteristics ==
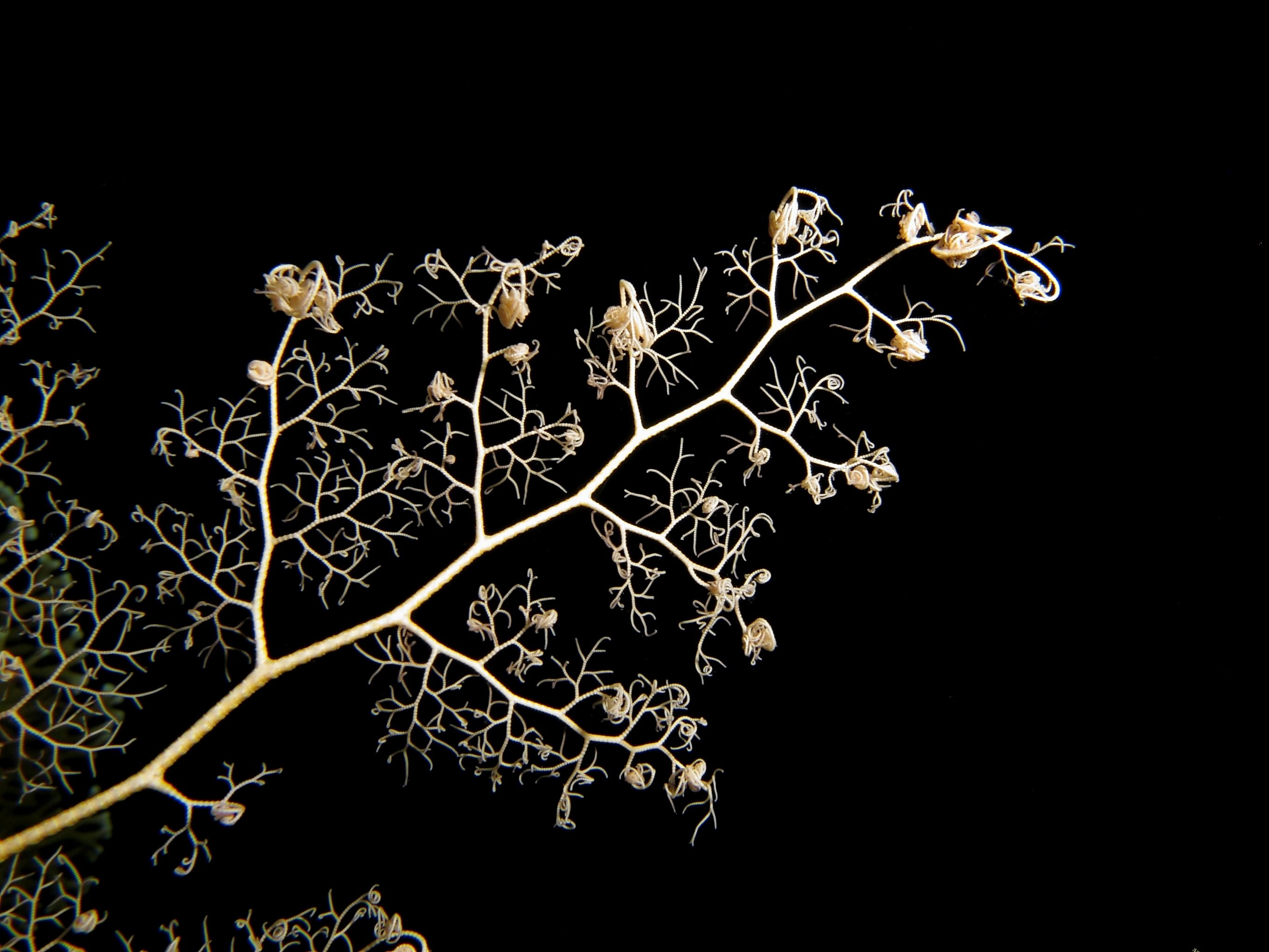
Close-up of Astroboa nuda arm

Many of the species in this order have characteristic repeatedly branched arms (a shape known as "basket stars", which includes most Gorgonocephalidae and two species in the family Euryalidae), while the other species have very long and curling arms, and go rather by the name of "snake stars" (mostly abyssal species).

Many of them live in deep sea habitats or cold waters, though some basket stars can be seen at night in shallow tropical reefs. Most young basket stars live on a specific type of coral. In the wild, they may live up to 35 years. They weigh up to 5 kilograms (11 lb). Like other echinoderms, basket stars lack blood and achieve gas exchange via their water vascular system. The madreporite is on the oral surface. Digestive glands are confined to central disc.

The basket stars are the largest ophiuroids, with Gorgonocephalus stimpsoni measuring up to 70 cm in arm length with a disk diameter of 14 cm.

== Systematics and phylogeny ==
The phylogenetic tree per O'Hara et al. (2017) is as follows.

- Euryalida Basket stars
  - - Gorgonocephalidae
    - Euryalidae
  - Asteronychidae

There are three extant families. One extinct family was described in 2025.

- Aspiduriellidae† Thuy, Numberger-Thuy & Gale, 2025
- Asteronychidae Ljungman, 1867
- Euryalidae Gray, 1840, emended Okanishi et al., 2011
- Gorgonocephalidae Ljungman, 1867

There is also a family yet to be named.

- Euryalida incertae sedis
  - Inexpectacantha† Thuy, 2011
  - Melusinaster† Thuy & Stöhr, 2018

== Gallery ==
Astrodia tenuispina
(Asteronychidae)

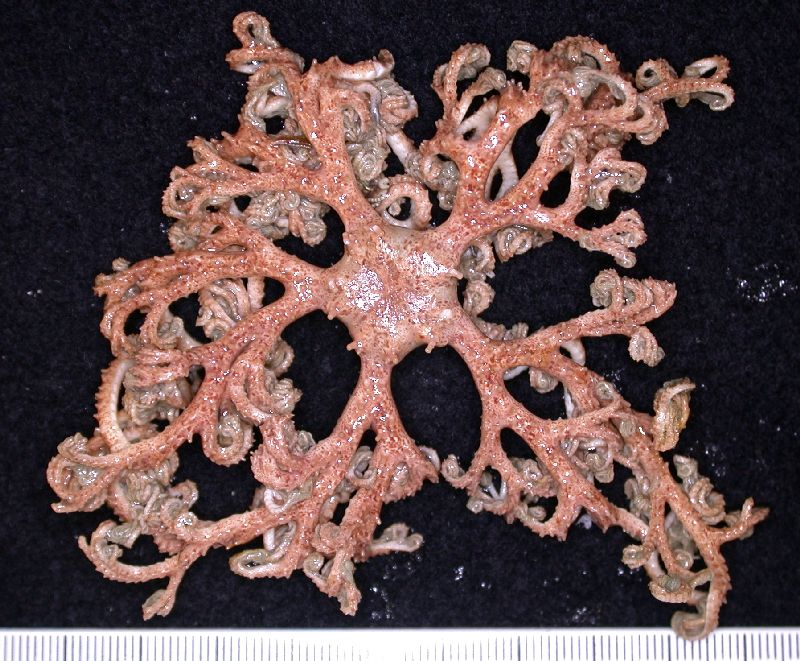
Euryale aspera (Euryalidae)

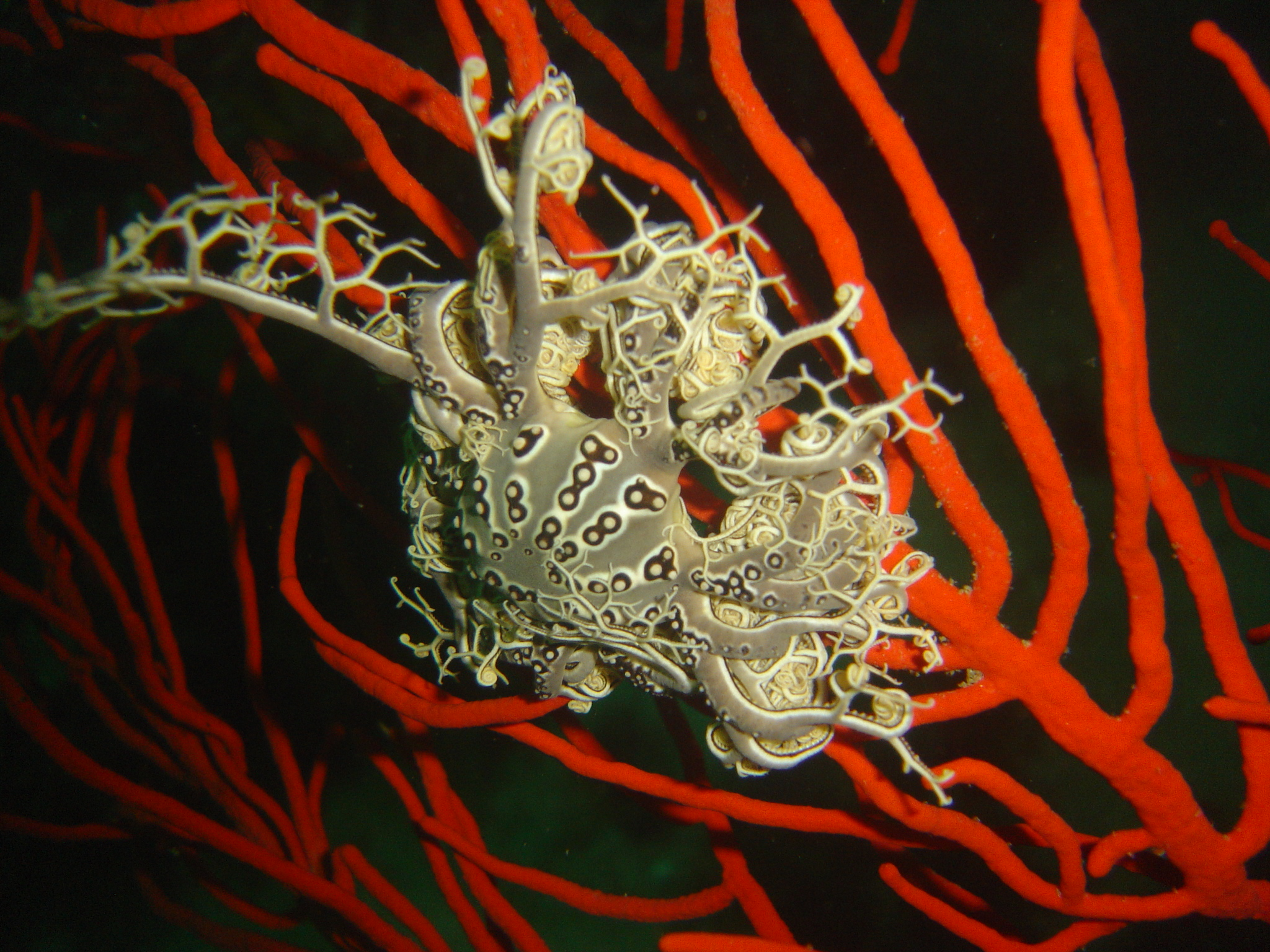
Astrocladus euryale (Gorgonocephalidae)

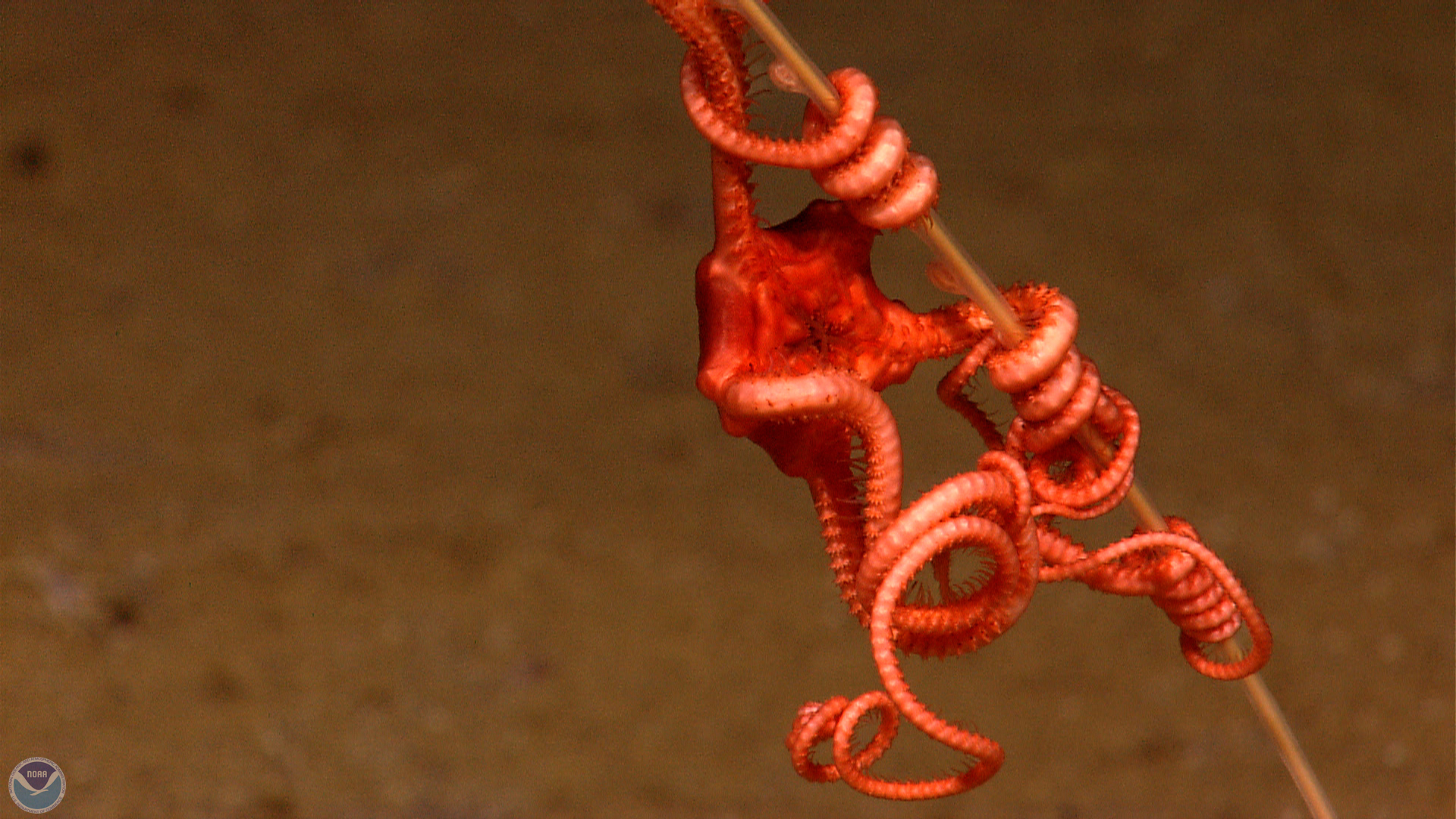
A euryalid brittlestar climbing on an octocoral outside Indonesia
