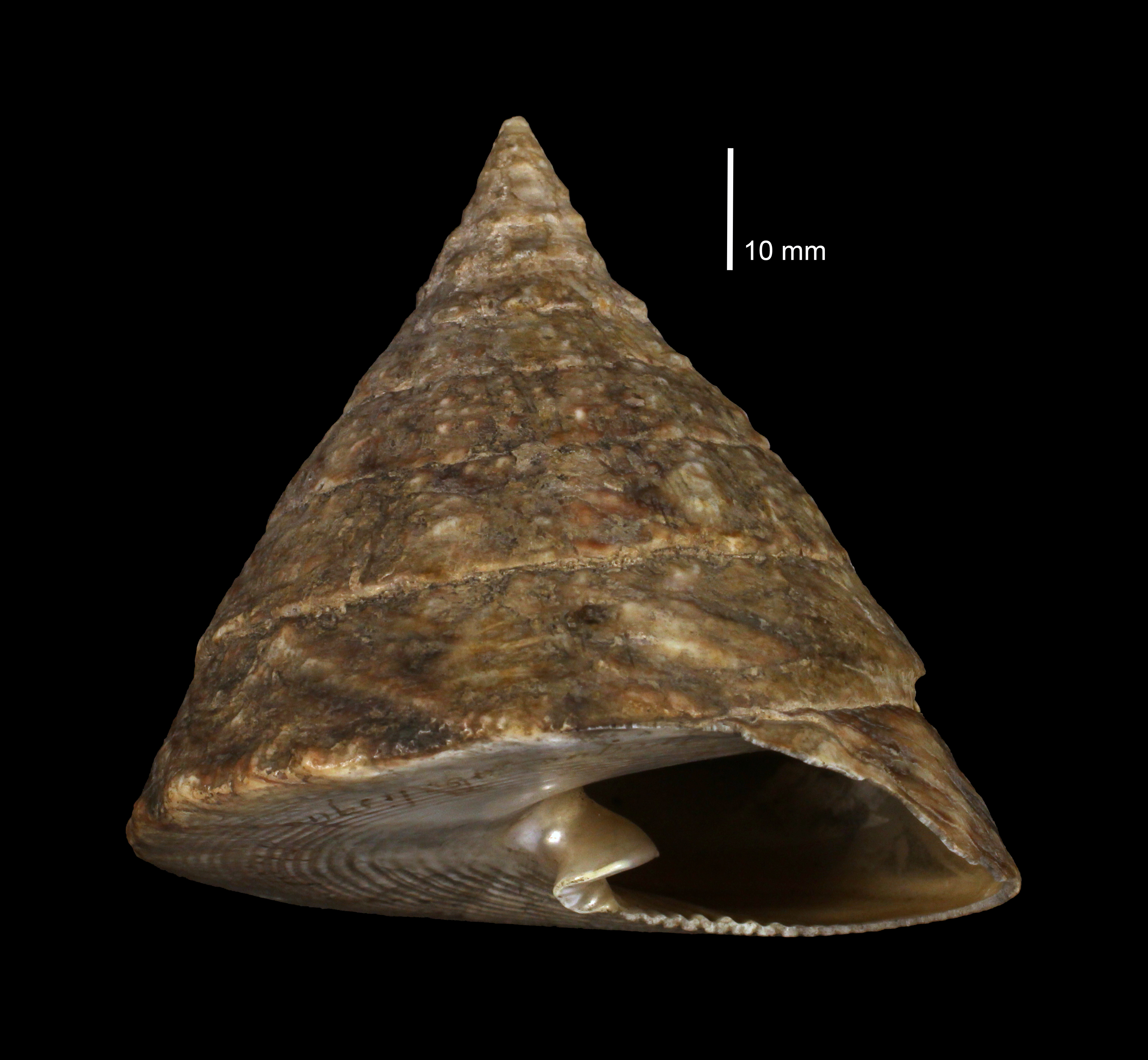
- Shell of Tectus pyramis (specimen at MNHN, Paris)

Scientific classification
- Kingdom: Animalia
- Phylum: Mollusca
- Class: Gastropoda
- Subclass: Vetigastropoda
- Order: Trochida
- Superfamily: Trochoidea
- Family: Tegulidae
- Genus: Tectus; Montfort, 1810

Type species
- Tectus pagodalis Montfort, 1810

Synonyms
- Pyramidea Swainson, 1840; Pyramis Schumacher, 1817; Tectus (Tectus) Montfort, 1810; Trochus (Tectus) Montfort, 1810

= Tectus =

Genus of gastropods

Tectus is a genus of sea snails, marine gastropod mollusks in the family Tegulidae.

== Description ==
The shell has a pyramidal shape. Its base is flat, without false-umbilicus. The rhomboidal aperture is very oblique, angular, and wider than long. The outer lip is lirate within. The columella is very short, vertical, with a strong spiral fold, ending anteriorly in a knob or point.

== Distribution ==
This marine genus has a wide distribution. It occurs in the Persian Gulf, the Red Sea, in the Central and East Indian Ocean and off East Africa, Oceania, Indo-China, Indo-Malaysia, the Philippines, East India, Australia (New South Wales, Northern Territory, Queensland, Western Australia), Kermadec Islands, New Caledonia, Anadaman Islands.

== Species ==
Species within the genus Tectus include:

- † Tectus altavillensis (Defrance, 1828)
- Tectus architectonicus A. Adams, 1853
- † Tectus athenasi (Vasseur, 1882)
- † Tectus aulacophorus (Cossmann & Pissarro, 1905)
- † Tectus bareti (Vasseur, 1882)
- † Tectus bourdoti (Cossmann & Pissarro, 1902)
- † Tectus branderi (Defrance, 1828)
- † Tectus britannus (Vasseur, 1882)
- † Tectus chavani Glibert, 1962
- † Tectus chenui Le Renard, 1994
- † Tectus cognatus (J. de C. Sowerby, 1840)
- † Tectus crenularis (Lamarck, 1804)
- Tectus (Tectus) dentatus (Forskål in Niebuhr, 1775)
- † Tectus extraconicus Gain, Belliard & Le Renard, 2019
- Tectus fabrei (Montrouzier in Fischer, 1878)
- Tectus fenestratus (Gmelin, 1791)
- † Tectus fluctus Gain, Belliard & Le Renard, 2019
- † Tectus fredevillensis Gain, Belliard & Le Renard, 2019
- † Tectus funiculosus (Deshayes, 1832)
- † Tectus gabrielis (d'Orbigny, 1850)
- † Tectus gervillii Gain, Belliard & Le Renard, 2019
- † Tectus leae Gain, Belliard & Le Renard, 2019
- † Tectus margaritaceus (Deshayes, 1832)
- Tectus mauritianus (Gmelin, 1791)
- † Tectus monilifer (Lamarck, 1804)
- † Tectus montissanctipetri (Binkhorst, 1861)
- † Tectus morgani (Cossmann & Pissarro, 1905)
- Tectus noduliferus'' (Lamarck, 1822)
- † Tectus ornatus (Lamarck, 1804)
- † Tectus planibasis Gain, Belliard & Le Renard, 2019
- Tectus pyramis (Born, 1778)
- † Tectus richardi Gain, Belliard & Le Renard, 2019
- Tectus royanus (Iredale, 1912)
- † Tectus spinalis Gain, Belliard & Le Renard, 2019
- † Tectus subcanaliculatus (Deshayes, 1863)
- † Tectus torticostulus Gain, Belliard & Le Renard, 2019
- Tectus triserialis (Lamarck, 1822)

Species brought into synonymy

- Tectus concavus (Gmelin, 1791): synonym of Infundibulum concavum (Gmelin, 1791)
- Tectus conus (Gmelin, 1791): synonym of Rochia conus (Gmelin, 1791)
- Tectus elatus (Lamarck, 1822): synonym of Rochia elata (Lamarck, 1822)
- Tectus magnificus Poppe, 2004: synonym of Rochia magnifica (Poppe, 2004)
- Tectus maximus (Koch in Philippi, 1844): synonym of Rochia maxima (Koch, 1844)
- Tectus niloticus (Linnaeus, 1767): synonym of Rochia nilotica (Linnaeus, 1767)
- Tectus pagodalis Montfort, 1810: synonym of Tectus mauritianus (Gmelin, 1791)
- Tectus tentorium (Gmelin, 1791): synonym of Trochus tentorium Gmelin, 1791
- Tectus tabidus Reeve, L.A., 1861: synonym of Tectus pyramis (Born, 1778)
- Tectus virgatus (Gmelin, 1791): synonym of Rochia virgata (Gmelin, 1791)
