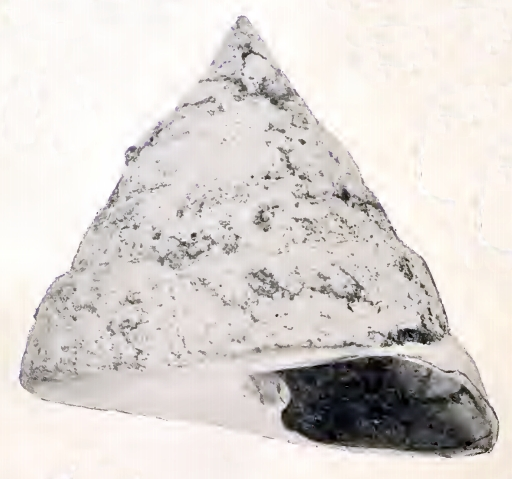
- Original image of a shell of Tectus royanus

Scientific classification
- Kingdom: Animalia
- Phylum: Mollusca
- Class: Gastropoda
- Subclass: Vetigastropoda
- Order: Trochida
- Family: Tegulidae
- Genus: Tectus
- Species: T. royanus

Binomial name
- Tectus royanus (Iredale, 1912)

Synonyms
- Tectus (Tectus) royanus (Iredale, 1912); Trochus royanus Iredale, 1912

= Tectus royanus =

Species of gastropod

Tectus royanus is a species of sea snail, a marine gastropod mollusk in the family Tegulidae.

== Description ==
The height of the shell attains 80 mm, its major diameter 97 mm. Dimensions of largest known shell 101 mm x 102 mm. The large, massive, imperforate shell has a pyramidal shape. In adult shells the upper surface is invariably covered with algae, coralline and other, while the base usually supports a colony of Serpula. The sculpture of these adult shells is scarcely distinguishable. Young shells, however, show the sculpture. The suture is well marked. The (more than 12) whorls are subscalar. The body whorl is strongly keeled. The base of the shell is flat. The shell is covered with very low rounded nodules along the lower edge, there being about 15 at a distance of 2 cm. from the apex, but sometimes they are so indistinct that they can scarcely be detected. The whole exterior is ornamented by close spiral beaded ribs, about 10 to a centimetre, crossed by diagonal growth lines, and covered with a white calcareous coating. The base is smooth save for diagonal growth lines on a white calcareous covering. But near the interior, where the coating is absent, it shows regular spiral threads, which are closest along the exterior margin. The colour of the shell is white, the interior pearly iridescent, with a well-marked white margin on the exterior of the thin, fragile outer lip. The aperture is quadrate and very oblique, the basal portion smooth inside. The columella is pearly, anteriorly terminating in a solid tubercle, and ascending with a semicircular sweep. The thin operculum is horny, multispiral with a central nucleus.

Tectus royanus is allied to Tectus pyramis (Born, 1778), an Indo-Pacific species, but differs in colour and in sculpture, which is much finer than that in T. pyramis.

== Distribution ==
This marine species occurs off the Kermadec Islands from the low water mark to 29 m.
