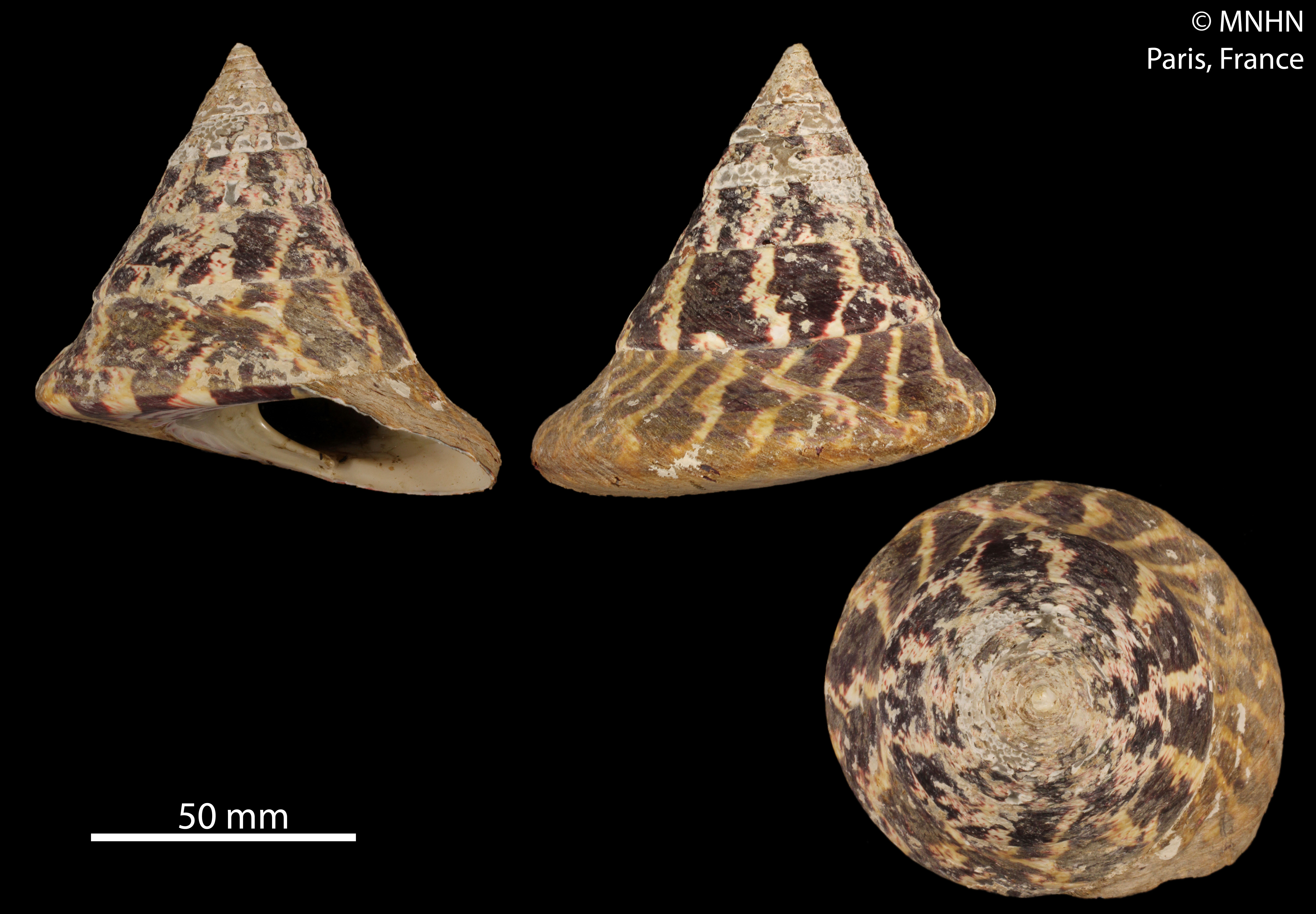
- Shell of Rochia nilotica (specimen at MNHN, Paris)

Scientific classification
- Kingdom: Animalia
- Phylum: Mollusca
- Class: Gastropoda
- Subclass: Vetigastropoda
- Order: Trochida
- Superfamily: Trochoidea
- Family: Tegulidae
- Genus: Rochia; Gray, 1857

Type species
- Trochus acutangulus Anton, 1838

Synonyms
- Cardinalia Gray, 1842; Tectus (Cardinalia) Gray, 1842; Tectus (Rochia) Gray, 1857; Trochus (Cardinalia) Gray, 1842

= Rochia =

Genus of gastropods

Rochia is a genus of sea snail, a marine gastropod mollusk in the family Tegulidae.

== Species ==
- Rochia conus (Gmelin, 1791)
- Rochia elata (Lamarck, 1822)
- Rochia hirasei (Pilsbry, 1904)
- Rochia magnifica (Poppe, 2004)
- Rochia maxima (Koch, 1844)
- Rochia nilotica (Linnaeus, 1767)
- Rochia virgata (Gmelin, 1791)

Synonyms

- Rochia acutangula (Anton, 1838): synonym of Rochia conus (Gmelin, 1791)
- Rochia maximus (Koch, 1844): synonym of Rochia maxima (Koch, 1844) (wrong gender agreement of specific epithet)
- Rochia niloticus (Linnaeus, 1767): synonym of Rochia nilotica (Linnaeus, 1767) (wrong gender agreement of specific epithet)
