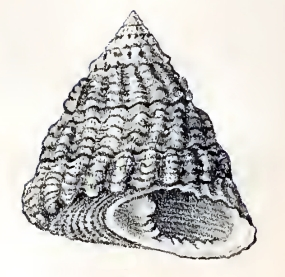
- Drawing of a shell of Trochus tentorium

Scientific classification
- Kingdom: Animalia
- Phylum: Mollusca
- Class: Gastropoda
- Subclass: Vetigastropoda
- Order: Trochida
- Superfamily: Trochoidea
- Family: Tegulidae
- Genus: Tectus
- Species: T. tentorium

Binomial name
- Tectus tentorium Gmelin, 1791

Synonyms
- Tectus tentorium (Gmelin, 1791); Trochus maculatus var. tentorium (Gmelin, 1791)

= Trochus tentorium =

Species of gastropod

Trochus tentorium is a species of sea snail, a marine gastropod mollusk in the family Tegulidae.

== Description ==
It differs from Trochus maculatus Linnaeus, 1758 in being obviously longitudinally plicate, especially on the lower part of each whorl.

== Distribution ==
This species occurs in the following locations:

- Tanzania
- the Philippines
- Fiji Islands
