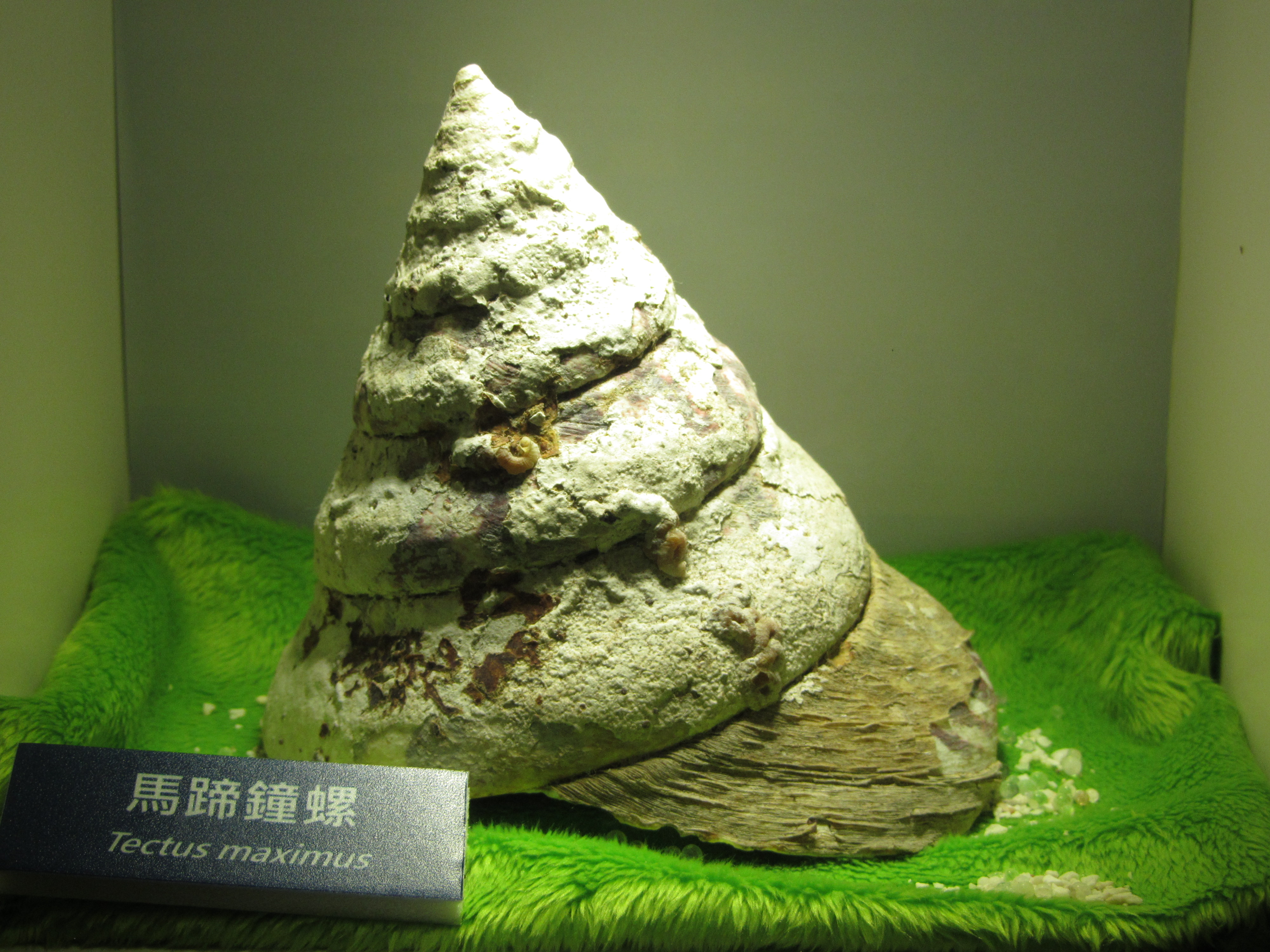
- Shell

Scientific classification
- Kingdom: Animalia
- Phylum: Mollusca
- Class: Gastropoda
- Subclass: Vetigastropoda
- Order: Trochida
- Family: Tegulidae
- Genus: Rochia
- Species: R. maxima

Binomial name
- Rochia maxima (Koch in Philippi, 1844)

Synonyms
- Rochia maximus (Koch, 1844) (wrong gender agreement of specific epithet); Tectus (Tectus) niloticus maximus (Koch, F.C.L. in Philippi, R.A., 1844); Trochus marmoratus Kiener; Trochus maximus Koch in Philippi, 1844

= Rochia maxima =

Species of gastropod

Rochia maxima is a species of sea snail, a marine gastropod mollusk in the family Tegulidae.

== Distribution ==
This marine species occurs off the Fiji Islands and Indo-Malaysia.

== Description ==
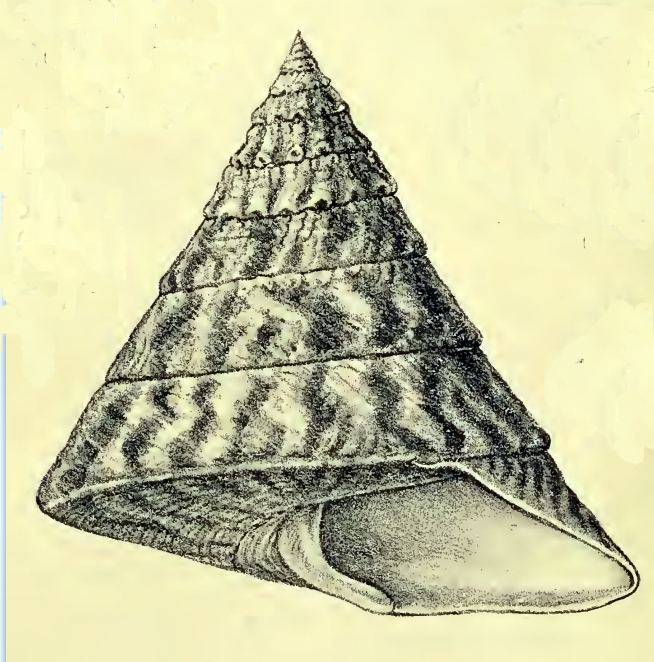
Apertural view of a shell of Rochia maxima

The height of the shell attains 95 mm, its diameter also 95 mm. The shell is less ponderous than Tectus niloticus. Its form is strictly conical. The whorls of the spire are decidedly plicate or tuberculate, planulate. The body whorl is not dilated at the periphery. The flat base is concentrically grooved. The columella is less oblique than in the type.

This species was first considered an arrested or primitive form of Tectus niloticus, as in the conic form, flat, lirate base, and sculptured spire, it exactly resembles an immature specimen of the latter species. But in 1869 Dr. von Martens considered them different species.
