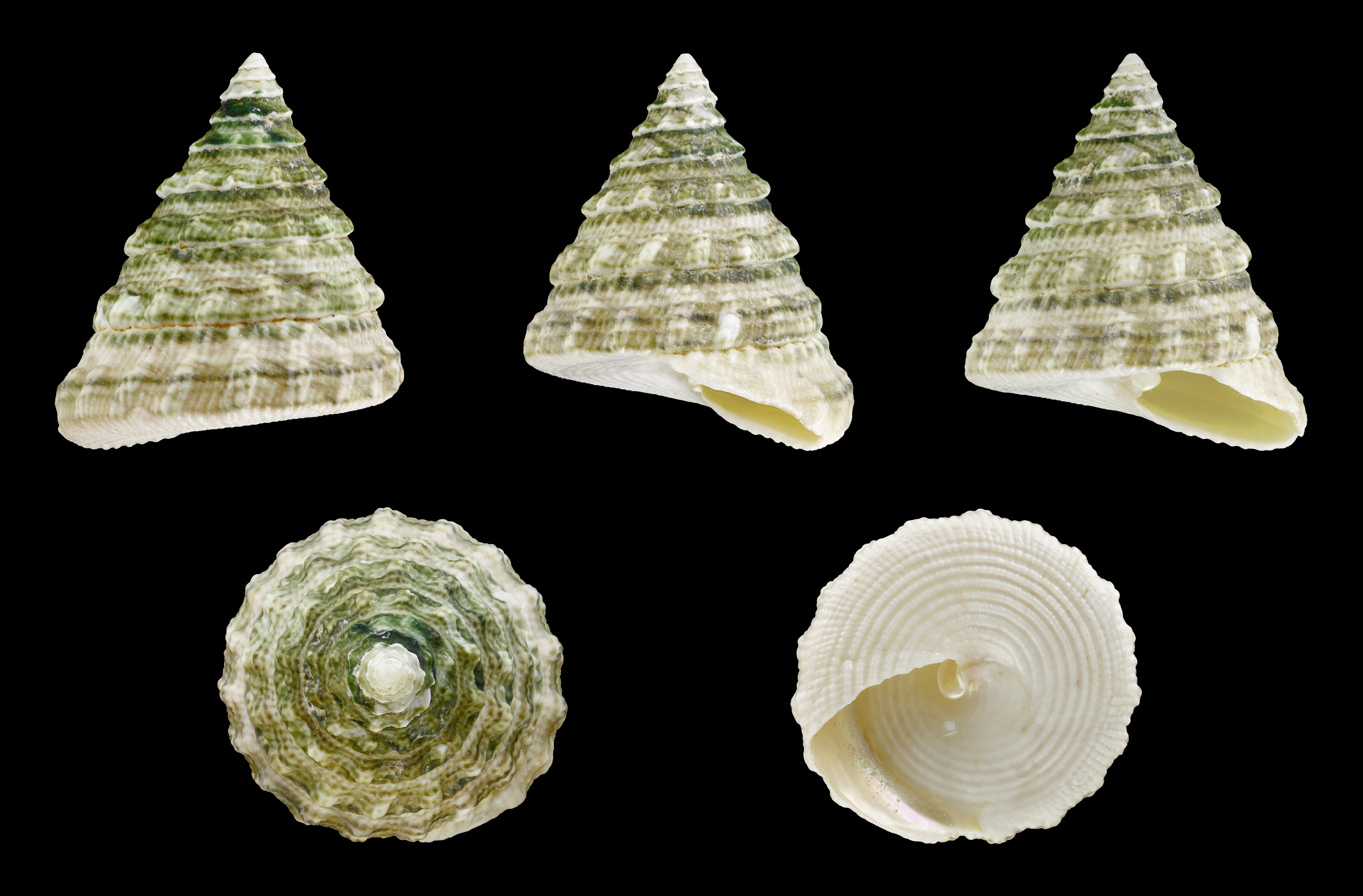
- Five views of a shell of Tectus fenestratus

Scientific classification
- Kingdom: Animalia
- Phylum: Mollusca
- Class: Gastropoda
- Subclass: Vetigastropoda
- Order: Trochida
- Family: Tegulidae
- Genus: Tectus
- Species: T. fenestratus

Binomial name
- Tectus fenestratus (Gmelin, 1791)

Synonyms
- Tectus (Rochia) fenestratus (Gmelin, 1791); Tectus (Tectus) fenestratus (Gmelin, 1791); Trochus apiaria Perry, G., 1810; Trochus caparatus Philippi; Trochus circumsutus Gould; Trochus crenulatus Reeve; Trochus exaltatus Philippi; Trochus fenestratus Gmelin, 1791 (original combination)

= Tectus fenestratus =

Species of gastropod

Tectus fenestratus, common name the fenestrate top shell or the latticed top shell, is a species of sea snail, a marine gastropod mollusk in the family Tegulidae.

== Description ==
The size of the shell varies between 17 mm and 50 mm. The imperforate, solid shell has a conic shape. It is, white or grayish, mottled and maculated with green, brown or olive. The base of the shell is unicolored, white. The apex is acute. The shell contains 9-11 whorls . The apical ones are smooth by erosion, the following armed around the lower margin with radiating squamose or (on the body whorl) solid tubercles, which are usually laterally compressed on the lower whorls, and number 12 to 20 on the body whorl. The entire surface above the periphery is covered with fine oblique wrinkles, which are more or less beaded by a few (3 to 5) revolving lirae. The; base of the shell is flat, concentrically lirate, the lirae 8 to 14 in number. The outer lirae are crenulated by fine radiating wrinkles which are continued a short distance inward from the periphery. The aperture is transverse. The outer and parietal walls are lirate within, the base more or less strongly uni-lamellate. The columella contains a strong downward directed acute fold.

This species is a variable form, which, however may be readily recognized by the sutural knobs and secondary sculpture of fine wrinkles above, and by the crenulated or beaded line around the outer edge of the base.

== Distribution ==
This marine species occurs in the Central and West Pacific Ocean, Indo-China, Indo-Malaysia, and off Papua New Guinea, New Caledonia and Australia (Northern Territory, Queensland, Western Australia).
