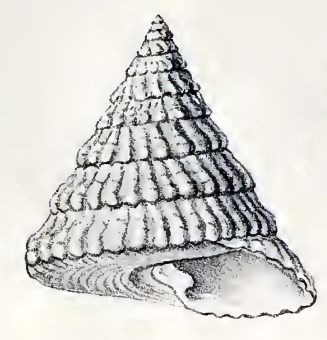
- Drawing: an apertural view of a shell of Tectus architectonicus

Scientific classification
- Kingdom: Animalia
- Phylum: Mollusca
- Class: Gastropoda
- Subclass: Vetigastropoda
- Order: Trochida
- Family: Tegulidae
- Genus: Tectus
- Species: T. architectonicus

Binomial name
- Tectus architectonicus (A. Adams, 1853)

Synonyms
- Pyramis architectonicus Adams, A. 1853; Tectus (Tectus) architectonicus (A. Adams, 1853); Trochus architectonicus (A. Adams, 1853)

= Tectus architectonicus =

Species of gastropod

Tectus architectonicus is a species of sea snail, a marine gastropod mollusk in the family Tegulidae.

== Description ==
The imperforate, whitish shell has a conical shape. The whorls are flat, subimbricating, and longitudinally costate. The ribs are thick, rounded and subnodose. The base of the shell is flat, and concentrically strongly lirate. The columella is short, tortuous, and truncate anteriorly. The margin of the lips is fimbriated.

== Distribution ==
The species occurs off Indo-Malaysia, Oceania, and Western Australia.
