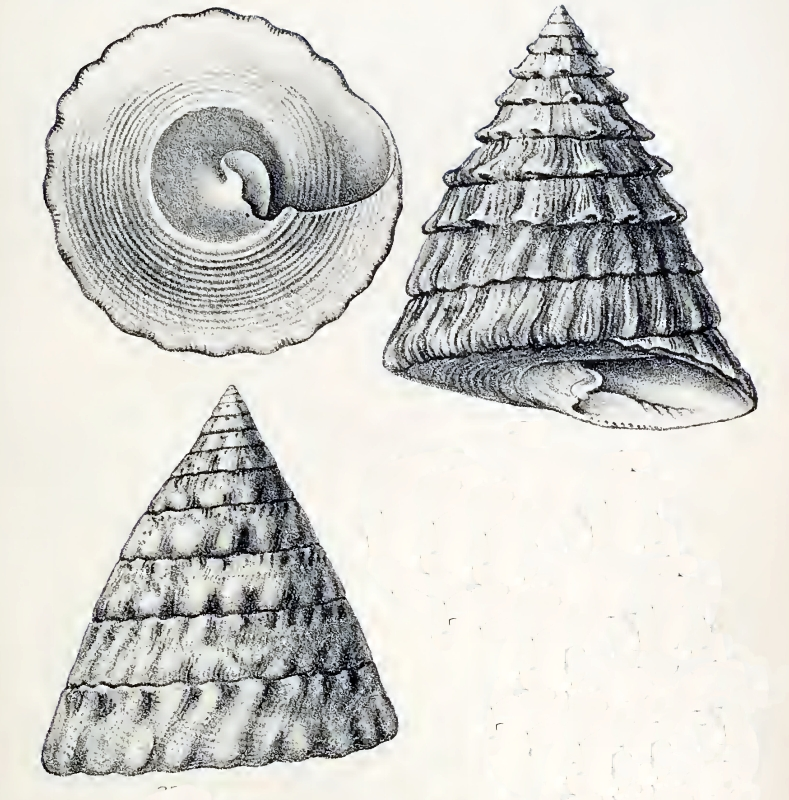
- Drawing with three views of a shell of Tectus mauritianus

Scientific classification
- Kingdom: Animalia
- Phylum: Mollusca
- Class: Gastropoda
- Subclass: Vetigastropoda
- Order: Trochida
- Family: Tegulidae
- Genus: Tectus
- Species: T. mauritianus

Binomial name
- Tectus mauritianus (Gmelin, 1791)

Synonyms
- Tectus pagodalis Montfort, P.D. de, 1810; Tectus (Tectus) mauritianus (Gmelin, 1791); Trochus constifer Jonas, 1846; Trochus mauritianus Gmelin, 1790

= Tectus mauritianus =

Species of gastropod

Tectus mauritianus, common name the Mauritius top shell, is a species of sea snail, a marine gastropod mollusk in the family Turbinidae, the turban snails.

== Description ==
The height of the shell varies between 40 mm and 60 mm, its diameter between 40 mm and 55 mm. The imperforate, solid shell has a conical shape. It is marbled and maculated with green, brown and rose-color on a whitish ground. The 10–12 whorls are planulate, bearing vaulted or solid tubercles which project at the sutures and upon the periphery of the body whorl, where they number about 16. The whorls are covered with oblique small folds, so interrupted as to appear more or less in spiral series. The base of the shell is flat, white a yellowish, unicolored, all over concentrically lirate. The lirae are smooth, narrow, separated by shallow grooves as wide or wider than the ridges, and continuous within the aperture upon the parietal wall. The aperture is transverse. The outer wall is lirate within. The basal margin is straight, bearing, within, a strong acute revolving lamella, opposite to a similar but smaller one upon the parietal wall. The columella is short, with a very strong acute median spiral fold.

The above description applies to the typical form of this species, the prominent characters of which are the smooth, subequal basal lirae, closely wrinkled upper surface, with projecting peripheral tubercles, and strongly uni-lamellar basal and parietal walls of the aperture. W.H. Dall observed considerable variation in the sculpture of the aperture inside in the species of this group; the lirae being sometimes completely absent in species which normally possess them.

== Distribution ==
This species occurs in the Indian Ocean and off Madagascar.
