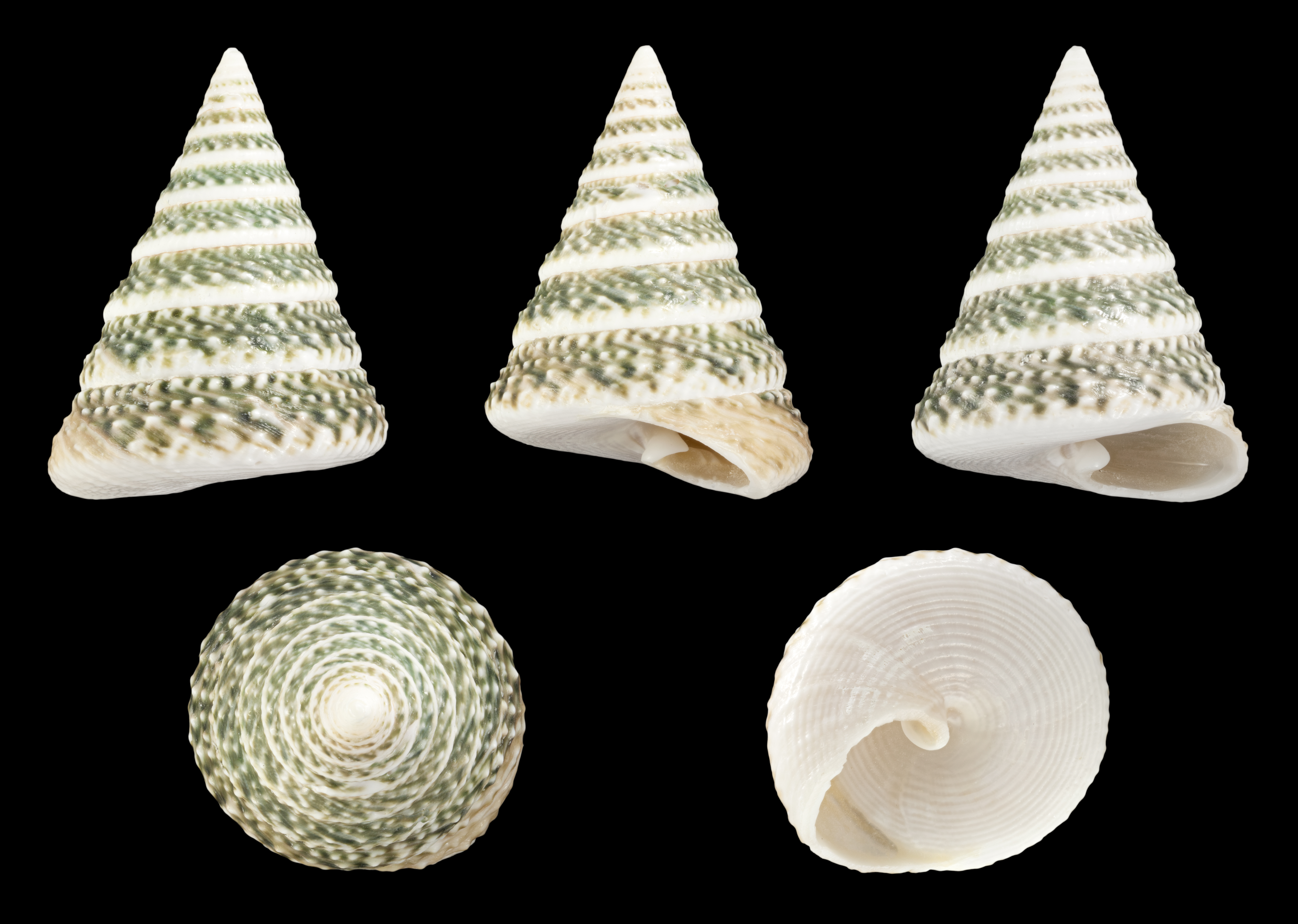
- A shell of Tectus triserialis

Scientific classification
- Kingdom: Animalia
- Phylum: Mollusca
- Class: Gastropoda
- Subclass: Vetigastropoda
- Order: Trochida
- Family: Tegulidae
- Genus: Tectus
- Species: T. triserialis

Binomial name
- Tectus triserialis (Lamarck, 1822)

SynonymsTectus (Tectus) triserialis (Lamarck, 1822)
- Pyramis triserialis (Lamarck, 1822); Tectus (tectus) triserialis (Lamarck, 1822); Trochus acutus Reeve (non Trochus acutus Lamarck); Trochus triserialis Lamarck, 1822 (original description)

= Tectus triserialis =

Species of gastropod

Tectus triserialis is a species of sea snail, a marine gastropod mollusk in the family Tegulidae.

== Description ==
The size of the shell varies between 20 mm and 60 mm. The imperforate, solid, heavy shell has a turreted-conic shape. It is flesh-colored, lighter beneath. It contains about 12 whorls, somewhat convex toward the lower, concave toward the upper part. The upper whorls show a single submedian series of rather prominent tubercles, the lower with about four subequal series of small, separated, rather acute tubercles, the surface between them minutely wrinkled. The base of the shell is nearly flat, and spirally lirate. The lirae become narrow toward the outer edge. The aperture is rhomboidal. The outer and parietal walls are more or less lirate within. The base has a deep seated spiral fold near the columella within . The columella is strongly, acutely folded, the fold directed downward.

== Distribution ==
This marine species occurs off the Philippines, Indonesia and Northern Queensland, Australia
