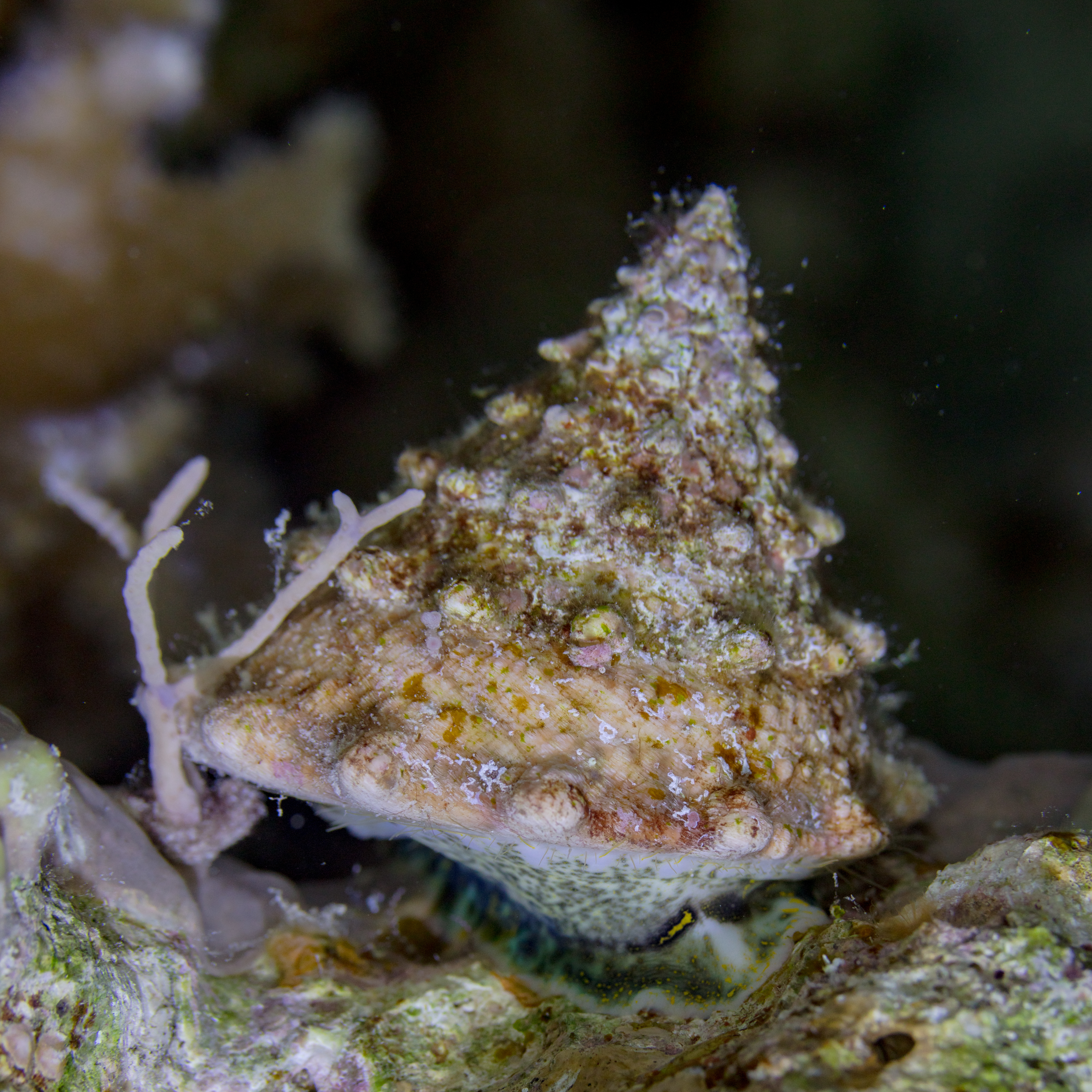
- Tectus dentatus in the Red Sea.

Scientific classification
- Kingdom: Animalia
- Phylum: Mollusca
- Class: Gastropoda
- Subclass: Vetigastropoda
- Order: Trochida
- Superfamily: Trochoidea
- Family: Tegulidae
- Genus: Tectus
- Species: T. dentatus

Binomial name
- Tectus dentatus (Forskål in Niebuhr, 1775)

Synonyms
- Trochus dentatus Forskål in Niebuhr, 1775; Trochus foveolatus Gmelin, 1791; Trochus pyramidalis Lamarck, 1822

= Tectus dentatus =

Species of gastropod

Tectus dentatus, common name the toothed top shell, is a species of sea snail, marine gastropod mollusk in the family Tegulidae.

== Description ==
Tectus dentatus has a shell that reaches a size of 40 – 150 mm. The large, imperforate shell is conical-turreted shape, solid and heavy, The surface shows strong rounded protuberances and it is whitish or pale brown, while the base has a blue-green color with pearly sheen. It contains about 12 whorls. These are planulate, more or less obviously finely radiately wrinkled. They often show a few spiral rows of beads, finely, very obliquely striate, but all this surface sculpture is often obsolescent. The periphery of the whorls and at the sutures is armed with distant strong radiating solid knobs, about six to ten on the body whorl. The base of the shell is flat, smooth, partly polished, with an appearance of obsolete concentric lirae about. the central portion, white, or with a zone of blue or of green or both colors surrounding the axial tract. The aperture is transverse, rather wide, rhomboidal. The basal margin is regularly curved, 6 to 8 plicate within near the columellar termination. The columella is very short, the fold stout, heavy, directed downward.

The shell of the living sea snail is often covered with mud or colonized by algae. The meat of this sea snail is appreciated as food and the shell is valued of commercial importance in manufacture of buttons and souvenirs.

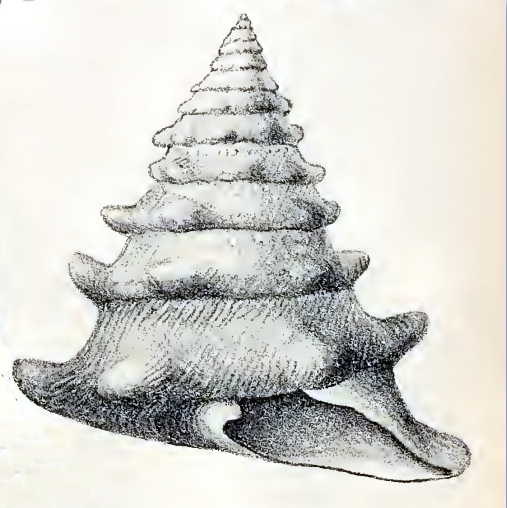
Drawing with an apertural view of a shell of Tectus dentatus

== Distribution ==
T. dentatus is endemic to the Northwest Indian Ocean, the Persian Gulf and the Red Sea.

== Habitat ==
This herbivorous species lives on coral reef shore between algae and on dead corals, in the intertidal and shallow subtidal areas at a depth up to 10 m. It feeds on various species of algae and diatoms.
