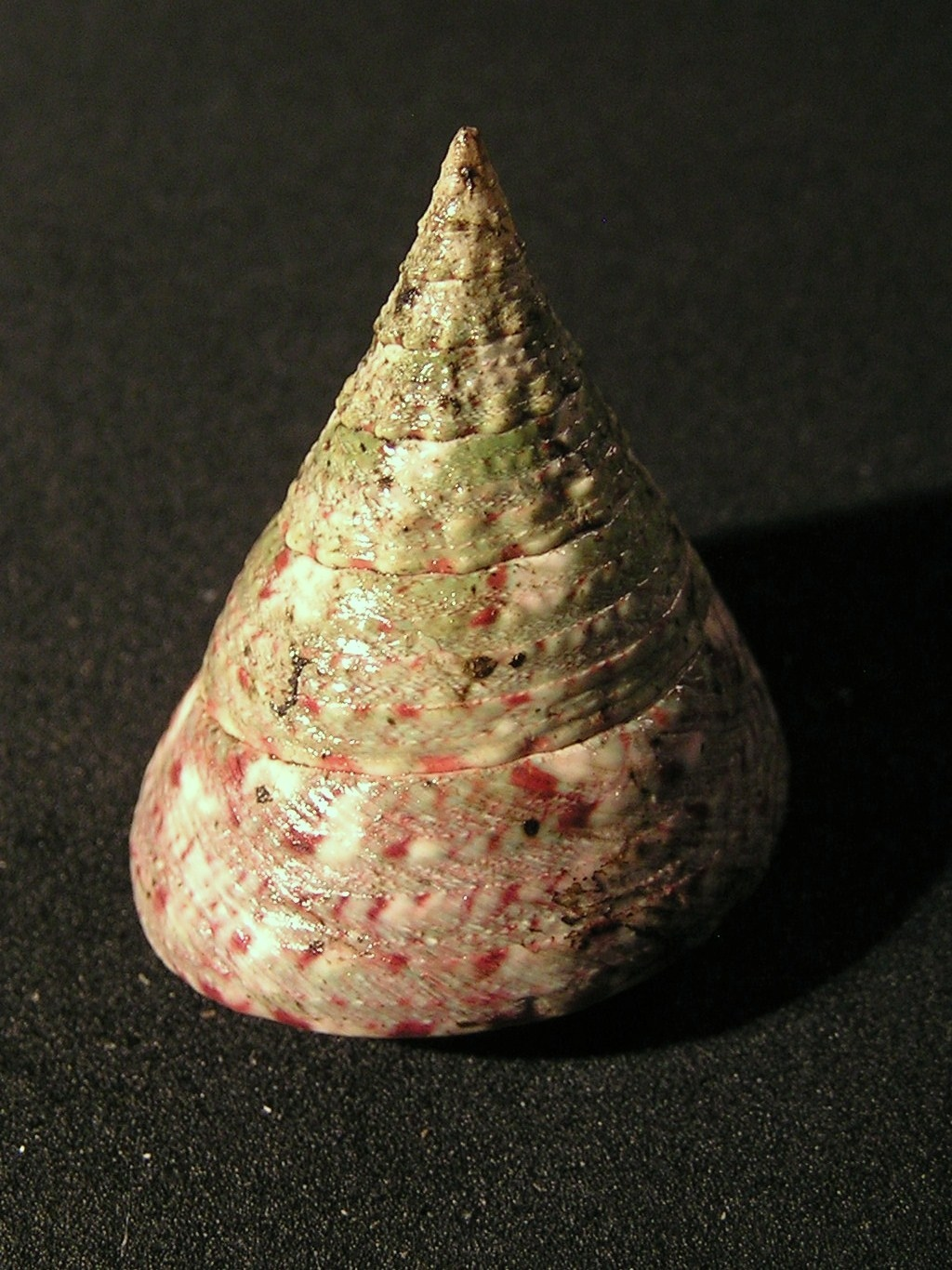
- View of a shell of Rochia elata

Scientific classification
- Kingdom: Animalia
- Phylum: Mollusca
- Class: Gastropoda
- Subclass: Vetigastropoda
- Order: Trochida
- Family: Tegulidae
- Genus: Rochia
- Species: R. elata

Binomial name
- Rochia elata (Lamarck, 1822)

Synonyms
- Tectus (Rochia) conus elatus Lamarck, J.B.P.A. de, 1822; Tectus elatus (Lamarck, 1822); Trochus elatus Lamarck, 1822 (original combination)

= Rochia elata =

Species of gastropod

Rochia elata is a species of sea snail, a marine gastropod mollusk in the family Tegulidae.

== Description ==
The size of the shell varies between 30 and 70 millimetres (1.2 and 2.8 in). It generally weighs 20–50 grams (0.71–1.76 oz), and in some rare cases nearly 100 grams (3.5 oz).

== Distribution ==
This marine species occurs off the Philippines, though some cases have been reported in the Bikini Atoll.
