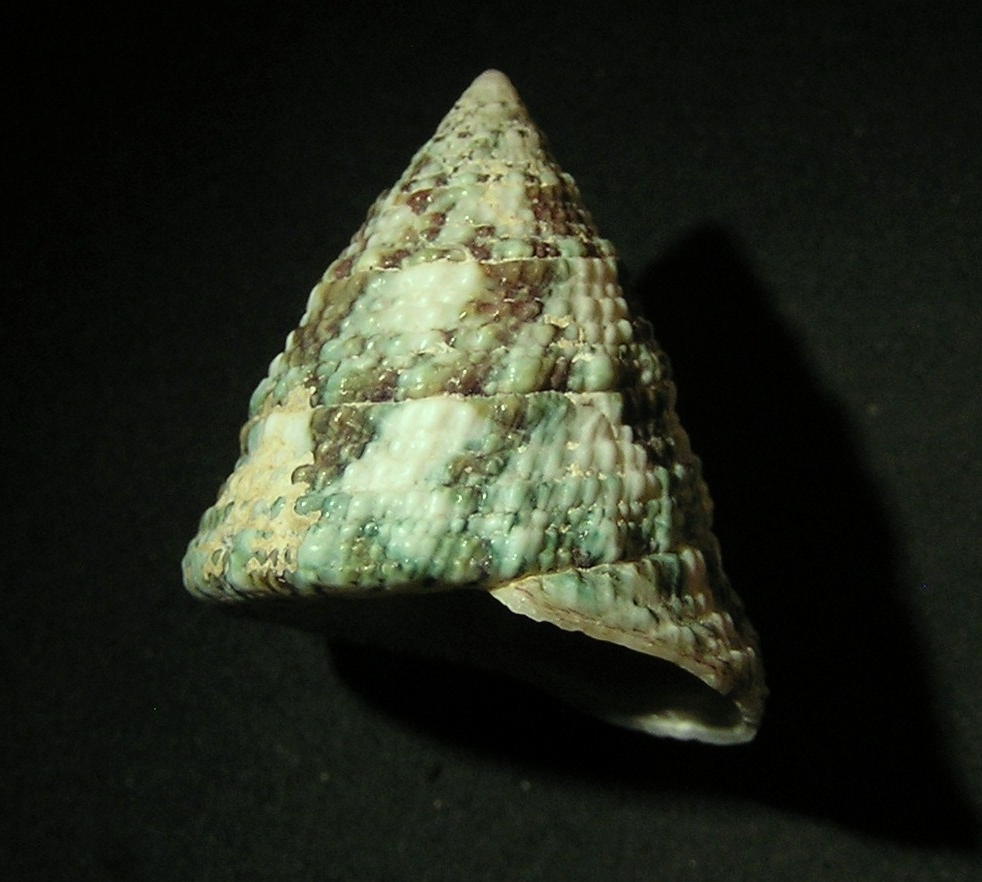
- Side view of a shell of Rochia magnifica

Scientific classification
- Kingdom: Animalia
- Phylum: Mollusca
- Class: Gastropoda
- Subclass: Vetigastropoda
- Order: Trochida
- Family: Tegulidae
- Genus: Rochia
- Species: R. magnifica

Binomial name
- Rochia magnifica (Poppe, 2004)

Synonyms
- Tectus magnificus Poppe, 2004; Trochus magnificus (Poppe, 2004)

= Rochia magnifica =

Species of gastropod

Rochia magnifica is a species of sea snail, a marine gastropod mollusk in the family Tegulidae.

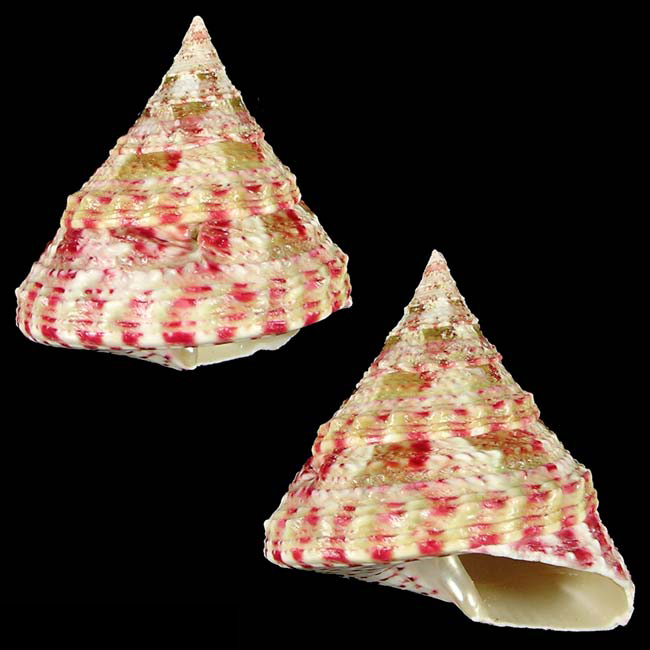
Seashell Rochia magnifica

== Description ==
The size of the shell varies between 13 mm and 51 mm.

== Distribution ==
This marine shell occurs off the Philippines.
