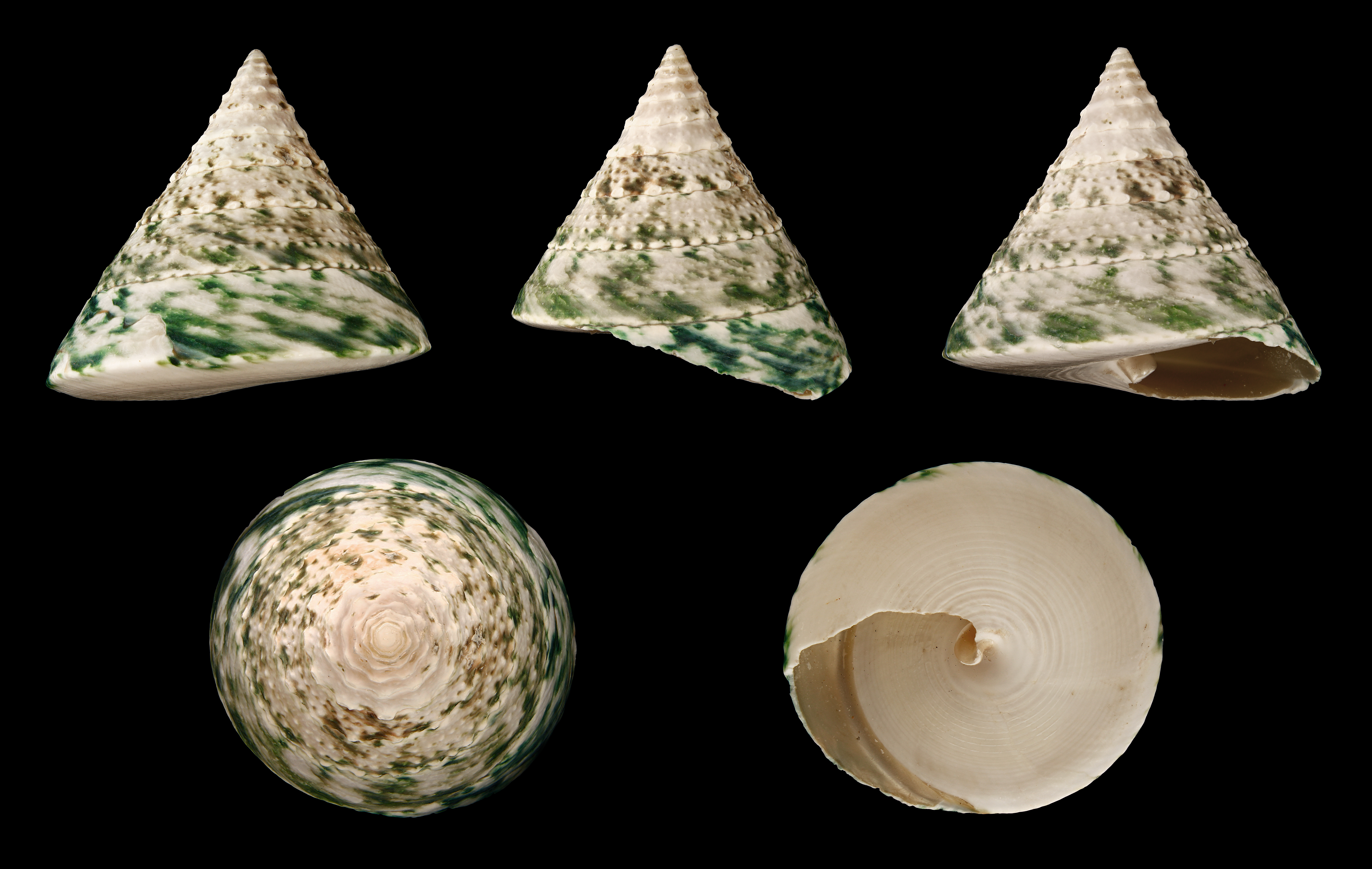
- Five views of a shell of Tectus pyramis

Scientific classification
- Kingdom: Animalia
- Phylum: Mollusca
- Class: Gastropoda
- Subclass: Vetigastropoda
- Order: Trochida
- Family: Tegulidae
- Genus: Tectus
- Species: T. pyramis

Binomial name
- Tectus pyramis (Born, 1778)

Synonyms
- Pyramis viridis Schumacher, 1817; Tectus tabidus Reeve, L.A., 1861; Tectus (Rochia) pyramis pyramis (Born, I. von, 1778); Tectus (Tectus) pyramis (Born, 1778); Trochus acutus Lamarck, J.B.P.A. de, 1822; Trochus obeliscus Gmelin, J.F., 1791; Trochus pyramis Born, 1778 (original combination)

= Tectus pyramis =

Species of gastropod

Tectus pyramis, common name the pyram top shell, is a species of sea snail, a marine gastropod mollusk in the family Turbinidae, the turban snails.

== Description ==
The size of the shell varies between 45 mm and 105 mm. The imperforate, solid, thick shell has a strictly conical shape. The spire is more or less attenuated above. The apex is acute. The color of the shell is yellowish or grayish, more or less mottled and marbled with green or brown, the base is white, green or brown. The shell contains 12–14 whorls. The upper ones are slightly extended outwards and plicate, tuberculate or undulating at the sutures. The folds or tubercles are obsolete on the lower whorls. The upper whorls are encircled with one or two spiral series of small tubercles or beads, which are increased to about five series on the middle whorls. The body whorl is beaded, but smoother than the preceding, or radiately finely wrinkled, or nearly smooth, angulate at the periphery. The base of the shell is flat, concentrically lirate, the ribs smooth, wide, separated by shallow grooves, obsolete toward the outer margin. The aperture is transverse, very oblique, subtriangular, the outer wall grooved within. The basal margin is straight, not concave in the middle, deeply notched at its junction with the columella. The sculpture inside shows revolving acute plicae, corresponding to the lirae which revolve around the central area outside. The columella is very short, with a very strong acutely carinated spiral fold.

== Distribution ==
This species occurs in the Indian Ocean off Chagos, the Mascarene Basin and in the Western Pacific Ocean and off Indonesia to Japan, Fiji and Australia (Queensland, Western Australia, Northern Territories, Tasmania)
