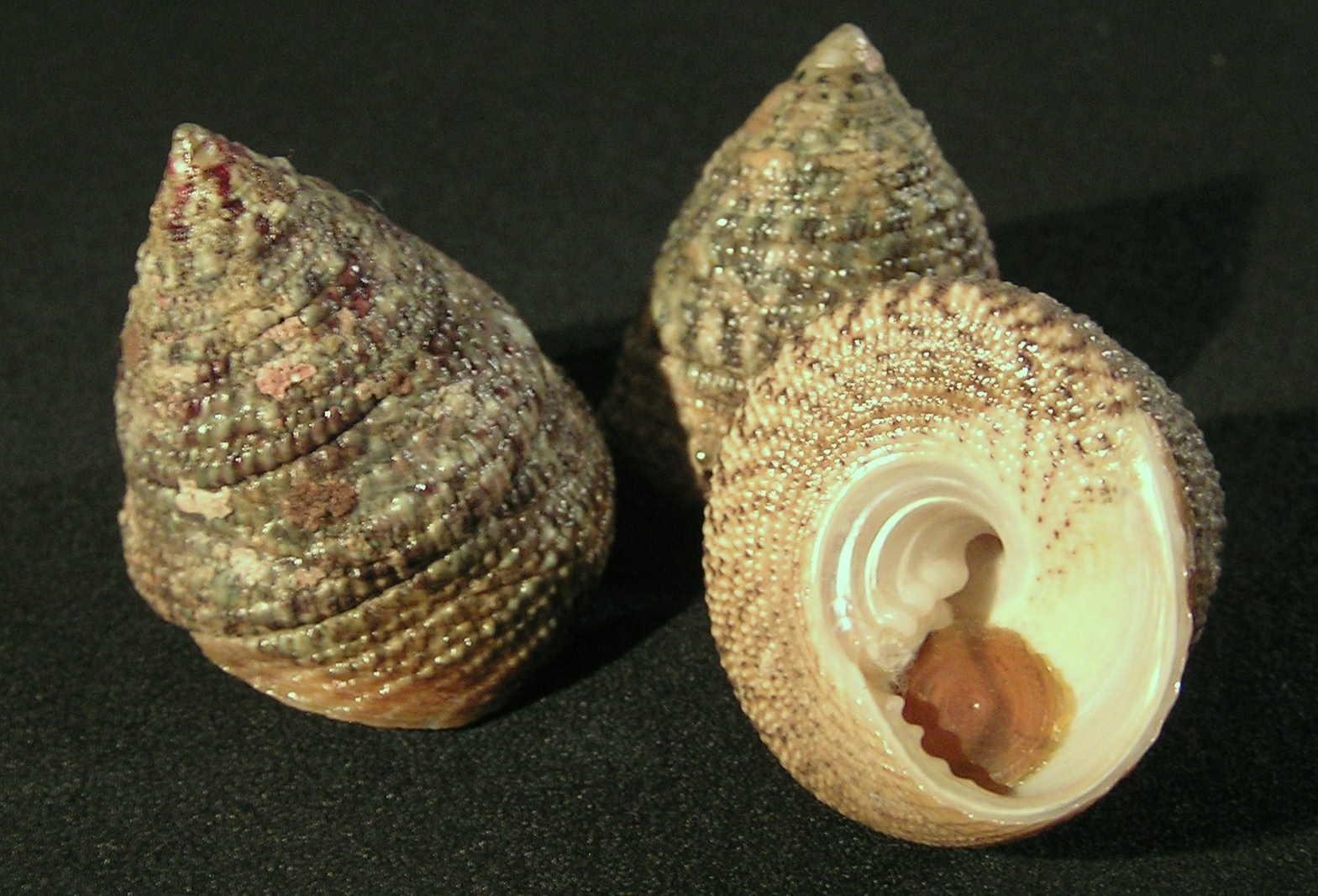
- Several views of a shell of Rochia virgata

Scientific classification
- Kingdom: Animalia
- Phylum: Mollusca
- Class: Gastropoda
- Subclass: Vetigastropoda
- Order: Trochida
- Family: Tegulidae
- Genus: Rochia
- Species: R. virgata

Binomial name
- Rochia virgata (Gmelin, 1791)

Synonyms
- Cardinalia virgata (Gmelin, 1791); Tectus (Cardinalia) virgatus (Gmelin, 1791); Tectus (Tectus) virgatus (Gmelin, 1791); Trochus (Cardinalia) virgatus Gmelin, 1791 (superseded combination); Trochus virgatus Gmelin, 1791

= Rochia virgata =

Species of gastropod

Rochia virgata, common name the striped top shell, is a species of sea snail, a marine gastropod mollusk in the family Tegulidae.

== Description ==
The height of the shell attains 45 mm, its diameter 40 mm. The solid, imperforate shell has a conic-pyramidal shape. It is white, above longitudinally broadly flammulated with red. The spire is somewhat attenuated and concave on its upper portion, then slightly convex. The sutures are linear. The 10 whorls are nearly planulate. The apex is acute. The sculpture of the spire consists of spiral prominently beaded lirae, about eight on each whorl. The body whorl is carinated at the periphery. The base of the shell is plano-concave, indented in the center, finely, densely lirate. These lirae are minutely beaded, red, articulated with white, the interstitial furrows white. The aperture is subrhomboidal, denticulate within the base. The columella is short, oblique, ending in a tubercle below, simply entering, not plicate, above.

== Distribution ==
This species occurs in the Red Sea and in the Indian Ocean off Chagos, Madagascar, the Mascarene Basin and Mauritius.
