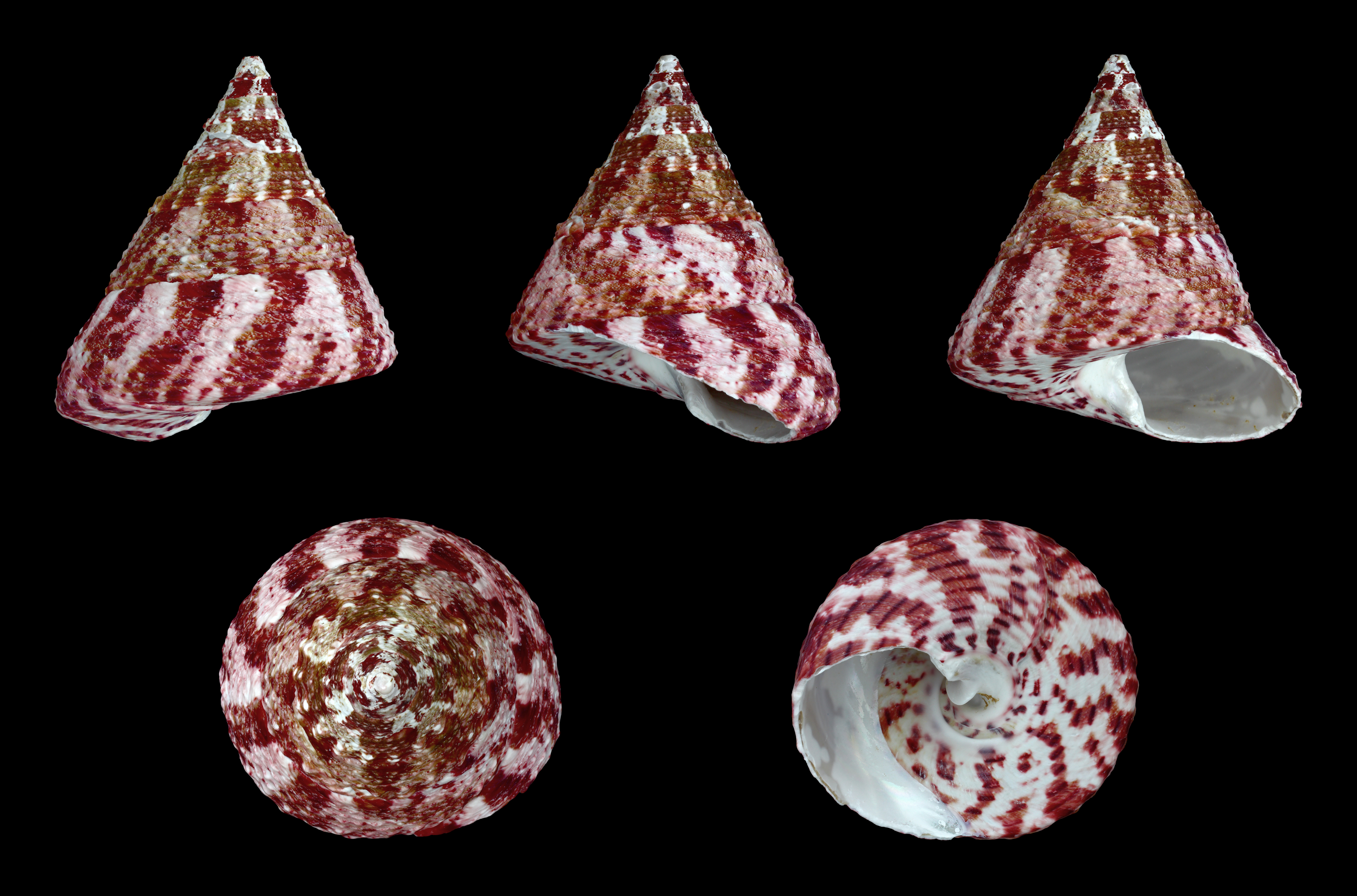
- Five views of a shell of Rochia conus

Scientific classification
- Kingdom: Animalia
- Phylum: Mollusca
- Class: Gastropoda
- Subclass: Vetigastropoda
- Order: Trochida
- Superfamily: Trochoidea
- Family: Tegulidae
- Genus: Rochia
- Species: R. conus

Binomial name
- Rochia conus (Gmelin, 1791)

Synonyms
- Rochia acutangula (Anton, 1838); Rochia altus Philippi, 1851; Tectus (Rochia) conus conus (Gmelin, J.F., 1791); Trochus acutangulus Chemnitz, J.H. in Isakawa, 1919; Trochus altus Perry, G., 1811; Trochus altus Philippi, R.A., 1851; Trochus apiaria Perry, 1810; Trochus conus Gmelin, 1791 (original description); Trochus elatus Lamarck, 1822 (non Brusina, 1865); Trochus senatorius Philippi, 1848; Trochus turris Philippi, 1846

= Rochia conus =

Species of gastropod

Rochia conus, common name the cone top shell, is a species of sea snail, a marine gastropod mollusk in the family Tegulidae.

== Description ==
The height of the shell varies between 45 mm and 70 mm, its diameter between 45 mm and 60 mm. The solid, thick shell has a conic-pyramidal shape. Its, axis is imperforate but appears sub-umbilicate. It is white, longitudinally flammulated with bright red. The spire is conic. The apex is acute. The 10 whorls are spirally encircled by numerous (about 10 on upper surface) beaded lirae, which are separated by superficial interstices. Above the sutures there is a series of short folds or knobs which usually become obsolescent upon the periphery of the body whorl. The body whorl is obtuse at the periphery, nearly flat below, indented around the false umbilicus, obsoletely concentrically lirate, the lirae about 9 in number, red and white articulated, interstices white. The aperture is transversely rhomboidal, somewhat rounded. The columella is nearly vertically descending, subdentate at base, above with a profoundly entering spiral fold. The parietal wall bears a heavy transparent callus, which is excavated around the axis.

== Distribution ==
This marine species occurs in the Red Sea, off the Philippines, Indo-Mamaysia, off Vietnam, New Caledonia and New South Wales, Australia.
