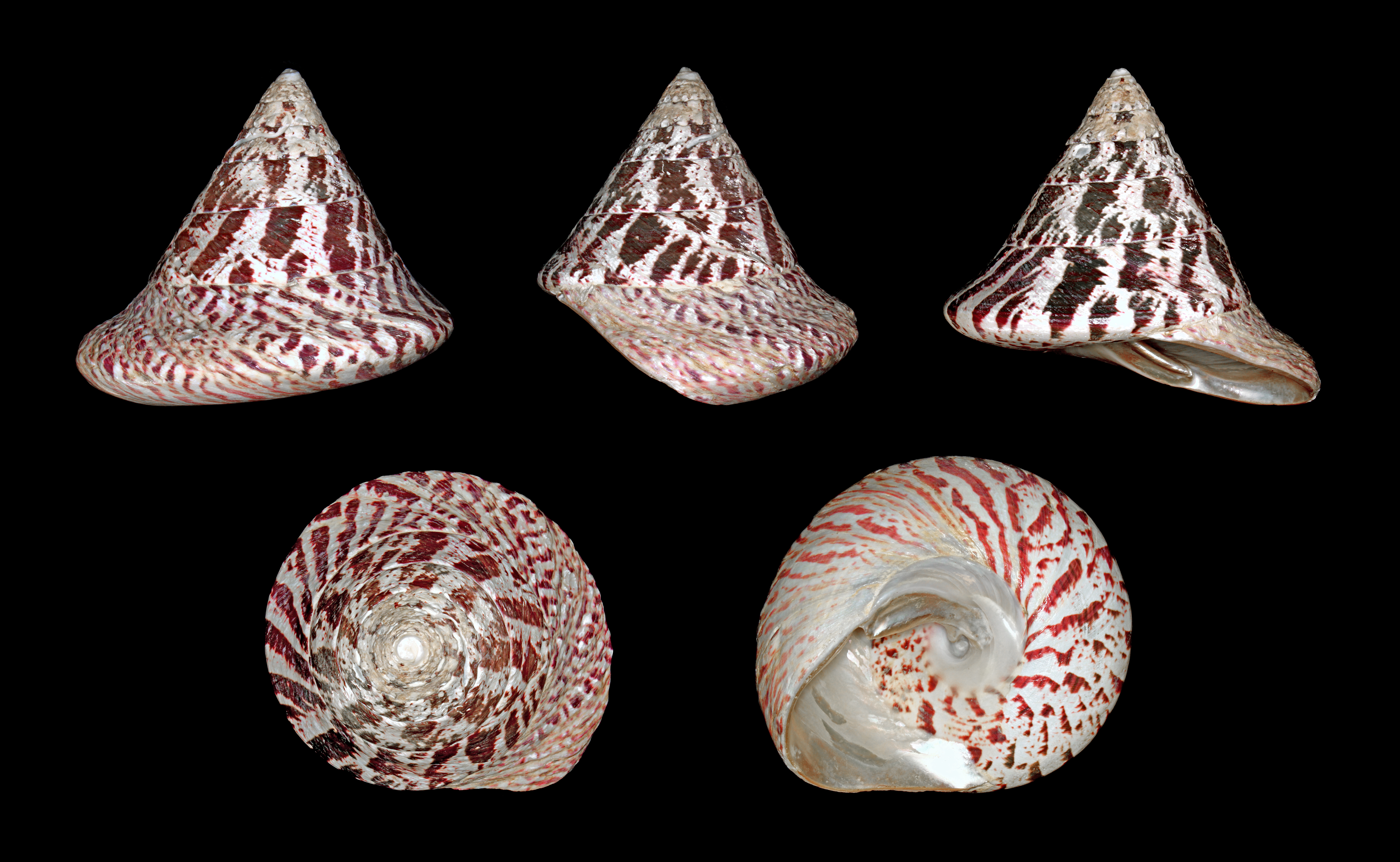
- Five views of a shell of Rochia nilotica

Scientific classification
- Kingdom: Animalia
- Phylum: Mollusca
- Class: Gastropoda
- Subclass: Vetigastropoda
- Order: Trochida
- Family: Tegulidae
- Genus: Rochia
- Species: R. nilotica

Binomial name
- Rochia nilotica (Linnaeus, 1767)

Synonyms
- Rochia niloticus (Linnaeus, 1767); Tectus niloticus (Linnaeus, 1767); Trochus flammeus Röding, 1798; Trochus niloticus Linnaeus, 1767 (original combination); Trochus zebra Perry, G., 1811 (non W. Wood, 1828)

= Rochia nilotica =

Species of gastropod

Rochia nilotica, common name the commercial top shell, is a species of sea snail, a marine gastropod mollusk in the family Tegulidae.

== Distribution ==
This marine species is widespread in the Indo-Pacific (from Madagascar, Sri Lanka, Andaman and Nicobar Islands, to as far east as French Polynesia, north to southern Japan and Hawaii, and south to Australia, including New Ireland, New Caledonia, North Australia, French Polynesia, etc.).

== Habitat ==
Juveniles live in shallow areas on intertidal reef flats, while adults prefer atoll reefs along the reef crest or on reef slopes at depths of 0 to 20 m. These gastropods feed on very small plants and filamentous algae grazed on coral and rocks.

== Life cycle ==
Rochia nilotica can live for up to 15 years and are able to reproduce at about 2 years of age. Females release more than 1 million eggs. Breeding period occurs during spring tides with nocturnal spawning. The eggs fertilised by males hatch to larval stages. Embryos develop into free-swimming planktonic marine larvae (trochophore) and later into juvenile veligers that drift with currents before settling on a rocky surface. After 2 or more years they may become adults.

== Description ==
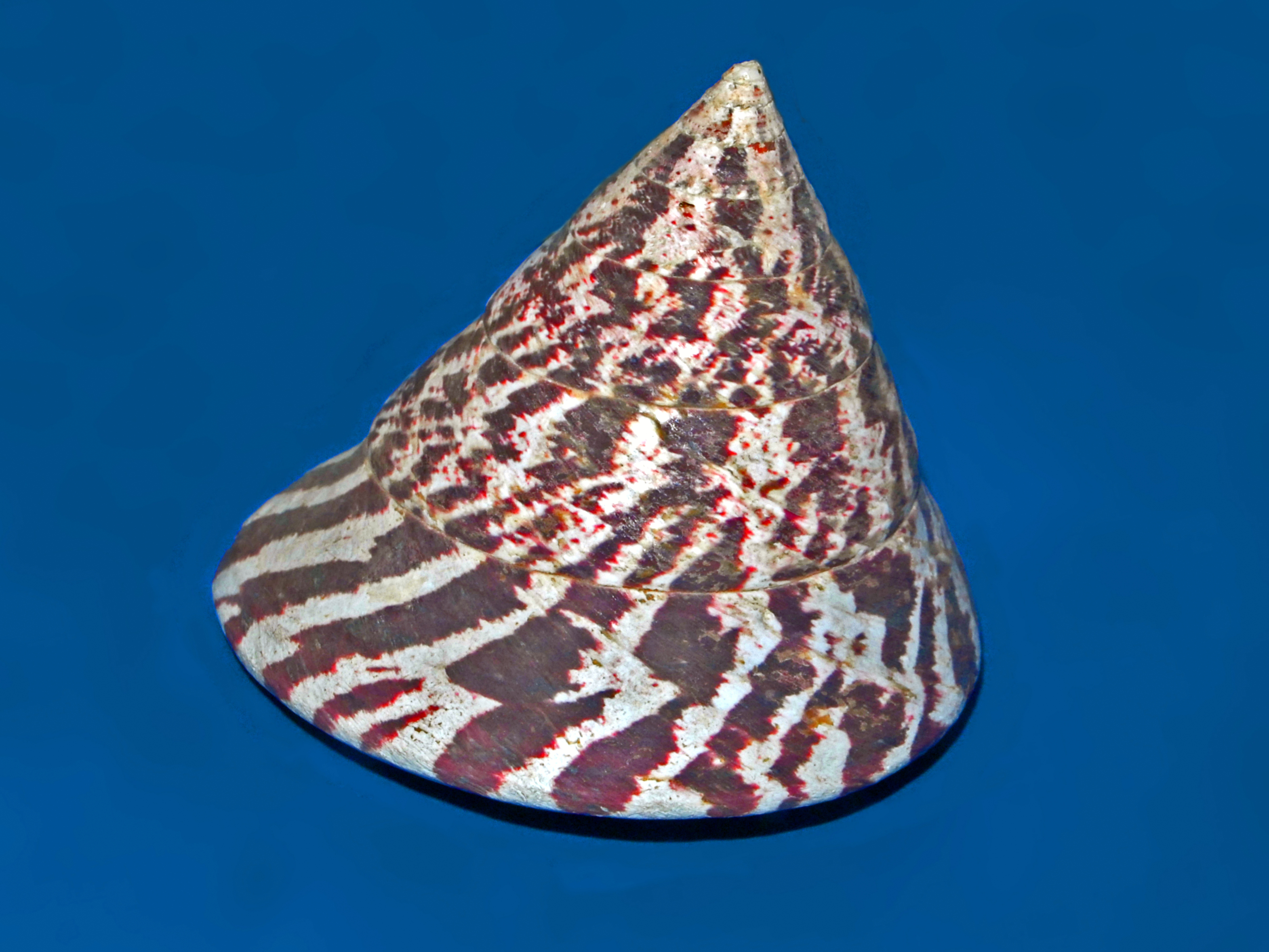
A shell of Rochia nilotica on display at the Museo Civico di Storia Naturale di Milano

The length of the shell varies between 50 mm and 165 mm, its diameter between 100 mm and 120 mm. The large, ponderous, shell has a conical shape, appearing subperforate. It is covered by a corneous striate, brown or yellowish cuticle usually lost on the upper whorls. Its color beneath the cuticle is white, longitudinally striped with crimson, violet or reddish brown. The base of the shell is maculate or radiately strigate with a lighter shade of the same. The spire is strictly conical. The apex is acute, usually eroded. The shell contains 8-10 whorls. The upper ones are tuberculate at the sutures, and spirally beaded, the following flat on their outer surfaces, smooth, separated by linear suture. The body whorl is expanded, dilated and compressed at the obtuse periphery, more or less convex below, indented at the axis. The umbilical tract is covered by a spiral pearly deeply entering callus. The aperture is transverse and very oblique. The columella is oblique, terminating in a denticle below, and with a strong spiral fold above, deeply inserted into the axis. The operculum is circular, thin, corneous, orange-brown, and composed of about 10 whorls.

== Human culture ==
The very large shells of this species have a very thick inner layer of nacre. They are used commercially to make mother of pearl buttons, mother of pearl beads, pendants and so on. In 2006, for example, the sole commercial export of the Wallis and Futuna Islands was 19 tons of "Trochus" shells, valued at US$122,000.

== Aquaculture ==
Rochia nilotica is a highly sought after resource in the Pacific and Indo-Pacific regions. This has resulted in the species being over-harvested. By 2007 the Solomon Islands, Fiji and Papua New Guinea have the most depleted stocks, with four surveyed sites in the Solomon Islands in 2006 averaging a density of only 11 trochus ha^-1. Releasing hatchery-reared juveniles is an option to replenish reduced wild stocks. Methods of culture are still under assessment and development where experiments have been conducted in Vanuatu;, Australia, Indonesia and Vietnam. Cage-based cultures have proven effective because they allow control of food and predators, both of which contribute greatly to the growth and survival of juveniles;. Other benefits of sea cages include lower cost, easy to construct and transport, manageability and the advantage of using existing water bodies.

Hatchery-reared individuals are usually lab-spawned and raised. Broodstock can be collected from local wild populations and from sites in which juveniles are to be released. Spawning is usually induced by heat shock under laboratory conditions;. Larvae are grown on coral rubble and shell grit, and are fed with benthic diatoms. (Nitzschia spp. and Navicula spp.). Juveniles used in cage experiments have an initial size of 8 mm shell diameter. Other experiments start at 15mm basal shell width.

The release size of cultured juveniles is important to ensure their survival and response to predators, where the larger the individual the less vulnerable it is to predation. A release size of 35mm (basal shell width, BSW) is recommended. The period of growth to this suitable size is about 6 months under optimum conditions. However, producing large individuals is costly. Alternatives such as high density releases of small juveniles and over large areas are less expensive and are thought to be solutions that can reduce predation pressure from fish species such as Choerodon cyanodus and Diodontidae and crustaceans such as Mancinella tubercosa and Calappa hepatica. Hatchery and transit conditions are also factors that may affect the vulnerability of juveniles to predators. It is recommended animals are reared on natural substrata before release.

The growth of the cultured individuals can depend on the density of juveniles in the cages and the likely causes are competition for food and space. An initial density of 100 trochus m-2 achieves a basal diameter of 10-20mm which can then be reduced to 50 trochus m-2 to yield basal diameters 25-40mm. Beyond this range a density of less than 10 trochus m-2 is recommended. Seaweed and algae are the main food and these grow on the dead corals and rocks which may occur naturally at the cultured sites or collected from adjacent areas and placed at the bottom of the cages. It is recommended that for cages with juveniles sized >30mm, these seaweed-covered rocks should be replaced 2 to 3 times a month and cover over 50% of the area. Cage design is important in preventing escape of juveniles and entry of predators and also shading of algal and seaweed on rocks. Recommended designs include cages with 8x8mm plastic mesh and an aluminium frame. Steel reef, plastic reef and plastic floating cages have proven ineffective as steel reef cages allowed high mortality from predator entry and plastic cages induced shading of the rocks algae and seaweed are attached to which results in low productivity. Suitable locations for reef cages are sand and rubble bottom reef bases exposed to less wave action or fore-flat zones which are 10m behind the reef crest with water depths of 0 to 2.5m during spring-tides. Shifting sand and sediment deposition areas may smother foraging surfaces and need to be avoided when allocating cages;. Wind-ward sections of the reef flat are considered suitable sites. Floating cages require frequent cleaning to remove fouling species and allow high water flow and/ or nutrient flux for high algal biomass and quality. Other environmental factors such as water temperature and salinity can have seasonal and episodic effects on the growth of the juveniles.

Suitable release sites of trochus juveniles into the wild include unconsolidated coral rubble and areas where predators are absent. It is common that juveniles are placed upright inside a cover such as a reef crevice; or under macroalgae as a means of predator protection.

The success of released individuals in contributing to wild populations can be measured by the mark and recapture method. However the validity of this method may be limited by factors such as detection methods, predation, escape of juveniles, translocation of juveniles by strong currents or detection may simply be not carried out.

== Bibliography ==
- Dautzenberg, Ph. (1929). Contribution à l'étude de la faune de Madagascar: Mollusca marina testacea. Faune des colonies françaises, III(fasc. 4). Société d'Editions géographiques, maritimes et coloniales: Paris. 321–636, plates IV-VII pp
- Higo, S., Callomon, P. & Goto, Y. (1999). Catalogue and bibliography of the marine shell-bearing Mollusca of Japan. Osaka. : Elle Scientific Publications. 749 pp.
- Williams S.T., Karube S. & Ozawa T. (2008) Molecular systematics of Vetigastropoda: Trochidae, Turbinidae and Trochoidea redefined. Zoologica Scripta 37: 483–506
