= Bastianelli =

Bastianelli is an Italian surname. Notable people with the surname include:

- Alfredo Bastianelli (born in Rome, 1951), Italian diplomat
- Giuseppe Bastianelli (1862–1959), Italian physician and zoologist
- Marta Bastianelli (born 1987), Italian cyclist
- Valentina Bastianelli (born 1987), Italian racing cyclist

== Other uses ==
- Bastianelli P.R.B., Italian flying-boat
- Trofeo Internazionale Bastianelli, a professional one day cycling race held annually in Italy

== See also ==
- Bastiani (disambiguation)
