= Angelo Celli =

Italian physician, biologist (1857–1914)

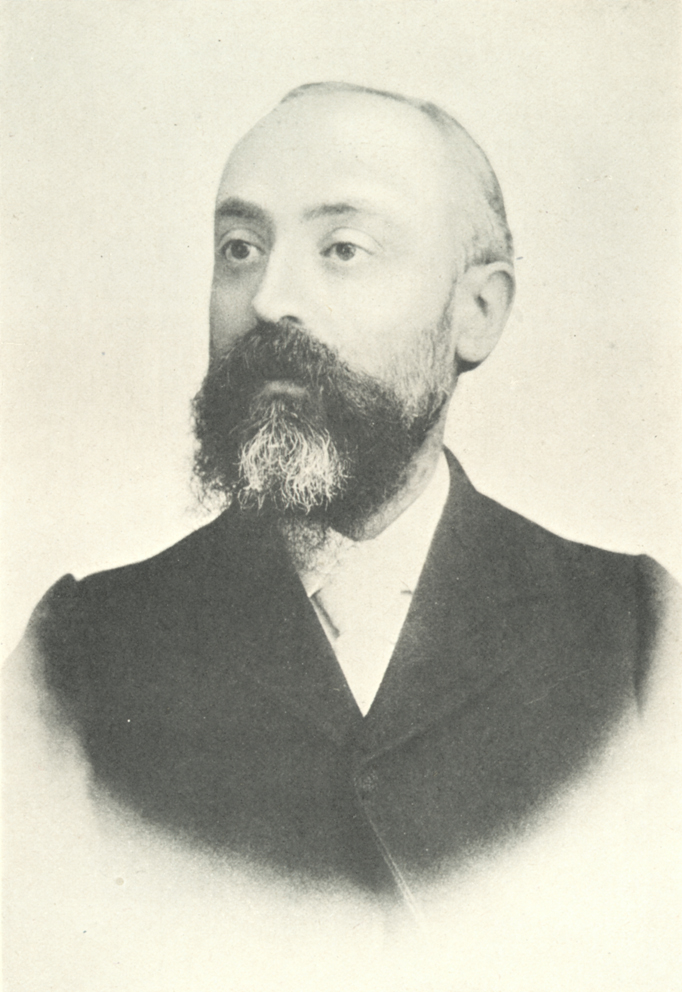
- Born: 25 March 1857; Cagli, Italy
- Died: 2 November 1914 (aged 57); Monza
- Resting place: Frascati; 41.49°N 12.41°E
- Education: Royal University of Rome
- Known for: Genus name Plasmodium; Malaria control Public health
- Spouse: Anna Fraentzel
- Awards: Mary Kingsley medal
- Scientific career
- Fields: Medicine; Zoology; Hygiene
- Workplaces: University of Palermo; Pasteur Institute of Italy; Royal University of Rome
- Author abbrev. (zoology): Celli

Angelo Celli (25 March 1857 – 2 November 1914) was an Italian physician, hygienist, parasitologist and philanthropist known for his pioneering work on the malarial parasite and control of malaria. He was Professor of Hygiene at the University of Palermo, and then at the Sapienza University of Rome. He founded the Pasteur Institute of Italy. With his wife Anna Fraentzel he established a number of medical schools in the Roman Campagna and dispensaries in Rome. He and Ettore Marchiafava correctly described the protozoan parasite that caused malaria and gave it the scientific name Plasmodium in 1885. Understanding the nature of malaria, he was among the first scientists to advocate and work for eradication of insects to prevent infectious diseases. He was elected to the Senate of the Kingdom of Italy in 1892.

== Biography ==
Angelo Celli graduated in medicine in 1878 at the Sapienza University of Rome. He joined the pathology department as assistant to Tommasi-Crudeli. In 1886, he was appointed Professor of Hygiene at the University of Palermo. He founded the Pasteur Institute at Palermo in 1887. He returned to the University of Rome in 1888 where he worked to his last day.

Celli married a German nurse Anna Fraentzel (born 1878), who was known for her voluntary health service during the First World War. They met in Hamburg where Celli was on a professional visit. They got married in 1899 and worked together in Rome. Celli died in 1914, and his wife in 1958. They are both interred in the cemetery of Frascati.

== Achievements ==
In 1880 with Ettore Marchiafava Celli studied a new protozoan discovered by Alphonse Laveran in the blood of malarial patients. Subsequently, it was shown to be the causative agent of malaria. He studied the biology and pathogenesis of the malarial plasmodium for years after this, working with Ettore Marchiafava, Amico Bignami, Giovanni Battista Grassi and Giuseppe Bastianelli. They were the first to use proper staining (with methylene blue) to identify malarial parasites as distinct blue-coloured particles in blood cells. They showed that the parasites lived inside the blood cell, and that they divide by simple splitting (fission). They were the first to recognize several of the stages of development of the malarial parasite in human blood. They called the new microorganism Plasmodium in 1885. Their works helped to differentiate different types of malaria as a result of infection with different species of Plasmodium.

Angelo Celli is famous in Rome (a marble sculpture of him is in the "Biblioteca dell'Istituto d'Igiene “G. Santarelli” in the Città Universitaria near Pincio) for his achievements as a hygienist, sociologist, and parliamentary deputy. After the formation of the Chinino di stato (a state organisation controlling prices of drugs, preventing sales of illegal or counterfeit drugs, and prosecuting speculators), he ensured that it applied to malaria medicines. The drugs were soon supplied free to the poor.

At the time the Pontine Marshes, the wetlands in Tuscany for instance Maremma and Basilicata were malarial areas. Francisco Saverio Nitti asserted that Atella, as an example, remained deserted until the adoption of the laws passed by the Chinino di Stato. Since the populations were illiterate and had a fatalistic attitude to malaria, he organized “Le Scuole per i Contadini dell'Agro Romano e le Paludi Pontine,” in English, "Schools for the Peasants of Agro Romano (vast areas of land around Rome)and Paludi Pontine (Pontine Marshes)" to educate and inform them. This scheme was subsequently adopted by Argentina and Greece.

Celli's scientific and social achievements led to his receiving the Laurea Honoris Causa from the University of Athens and the Royal Society for the Promotion of Health in London. He was awarded the Mary Kingsley medal by the Liverpool School of Tropical Medicine.

Although the Celli archives are preserved at the Faculty of experimental medicine and pathology of the Sapienza University of Rome, some letters and documents attesting Celli's constant engagement in favour of public healthcare and his passion as scholar and teacher of hygiene are kept in the library of the Museo Galileo in Florence.

== Works ==
- Le nostre sostanze alimentari considerate come terreno di coltura di germi patogeni, Roma, 1888
- Il primo anno di vita della stazione antirabbica di Palermo, Roma, 1888
- Our food substances considered as a breeding ground for germs, Rome, 1888
- The first year of the life of the station rabies Palermo, Rome, 1888
- La malaria dei bovini nella campagna romana, Roma, 1897 [English version: The malaria of cattle in the Roman countryside, Rome, 1897]
- Stato palustre ed anofelico (paludismo) senza malaria, Roma, 1902
- L' opera del medico nella lotta contro la malaria, Napoli, 1904
- La malaria nella storia medievale di Roma, Roma, 1923 [English version: The history of malaria on the Roman Campagna from ancient times. London, John Bale, Sons Danielsson (1933)]

== Additional sources ==
- Conci, C. (1975). Repertorio delle biografie e bibliografie degli scrittori e cultori italiani di entomologia. Mem. Soc. Ent. Ital. 48 1969(4) 817-1069.
- Conci, C. & Poggi, R. (1996). Iconography of Italian Entomologists, with essential biographical data. Mem. Soc. Ent. Ital. 75 159-382.
- Howard, L. O. (1915). [Celli, A.] Pop. Sci. Monthly 87 72, Portrait.
- Howard, L. O. (1930). History of applied Entomology (Somewhat Anecdotal).Smiths. Miscell. Coll. 84 X+1-564.
