= Stigmata =

Marks resembling the wounds of Jesus

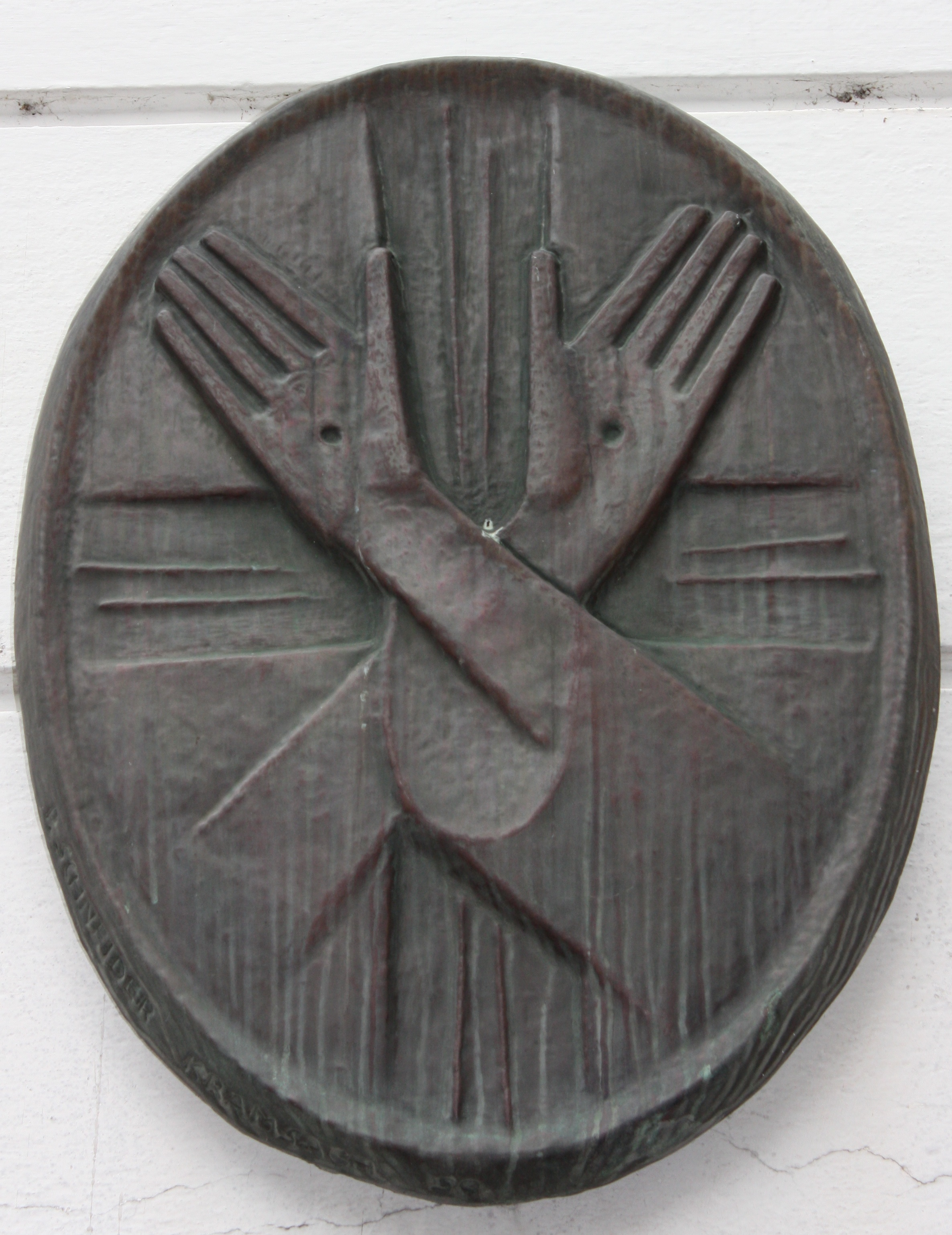
Hands with stigmata, depicted on a Franciscan church in Lienz, Austria

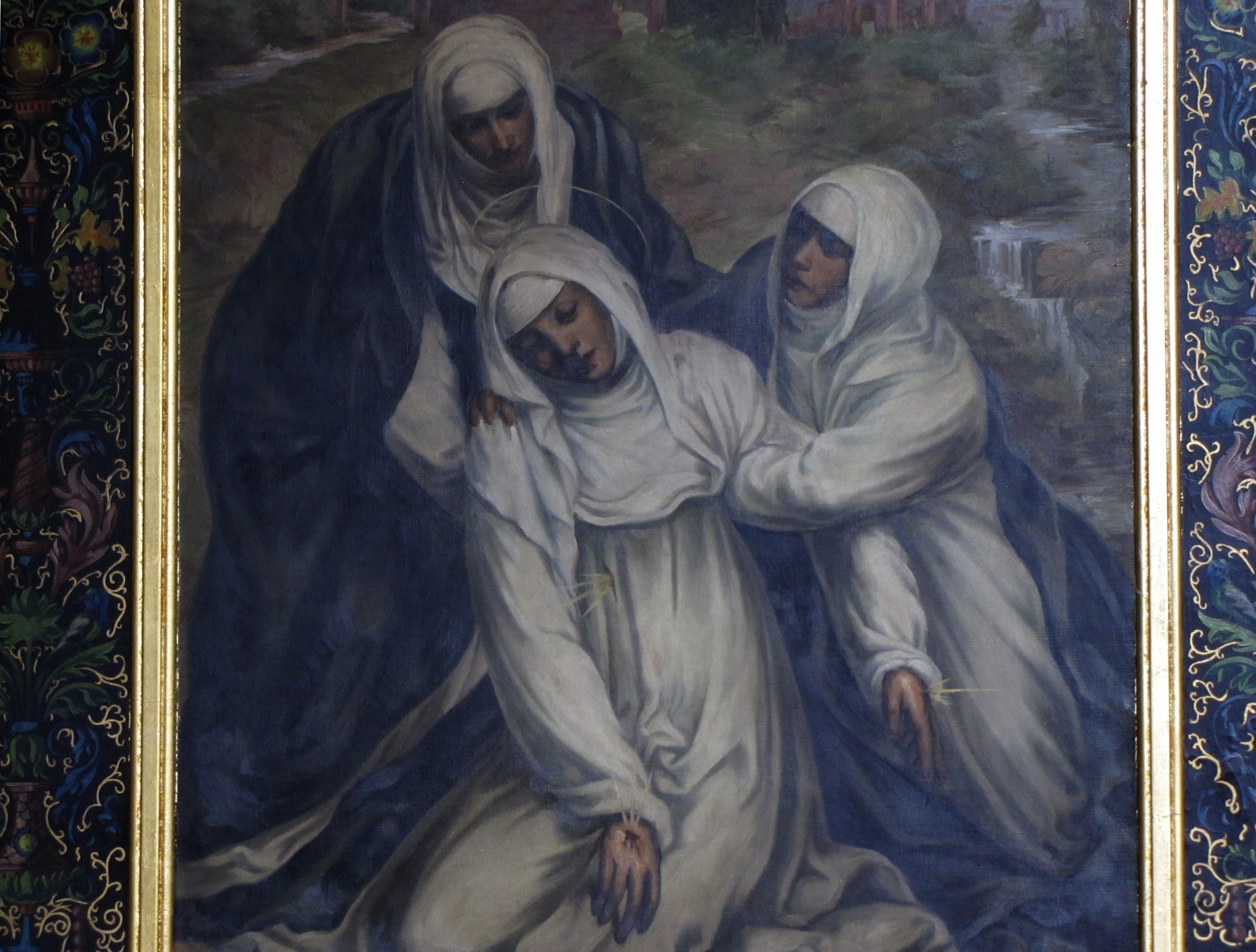
St Catherine fainting from the stigmata by Il Sodoma, Church of Saint Pantaleon, Alsace, France

Stigmata (Ancient Greek: στίγματα, plural of στίγμα stigma, 'mark, spot, brand'), in Roman Catholicism, are bodily wounds, scars and pain which appear in locations corresponding to the crucifixion wounds of Jesus Christ: the hands, wrists, feet, near the heart, the head (from the crown of thorns), and back (from carrying the cross and scourging).

St. Francis of Assisi is widely considered the first recorded stigmatic. For over fifty years, St. Padre Pio of Pietrelcina of the Order of Friars Minor Capuchin reported stigmata which were studied by several 20th-century physicians. Stigmatics are primarily a Roman Catholic phenomenon; the Eastern Orthodox Church professes no official view on them.

A high percentage (probably over 80%) of all stigmatics are women. In his book Stigmata: A Medieval Phenomenon in a Modern Age, Ted Harrison suggests that there is no single mechanism whereby the marks of stigmata were produced. What is important is that the marks are recognised by others as being of religious significance. Most cases of stigmata have been the result of trickery and fraud. Some cases have also included reportings of a mysterious chalice in visions being given to stigmatics to drink from or the feeling of a sharp sword being driven into one's chest.

== Description ==
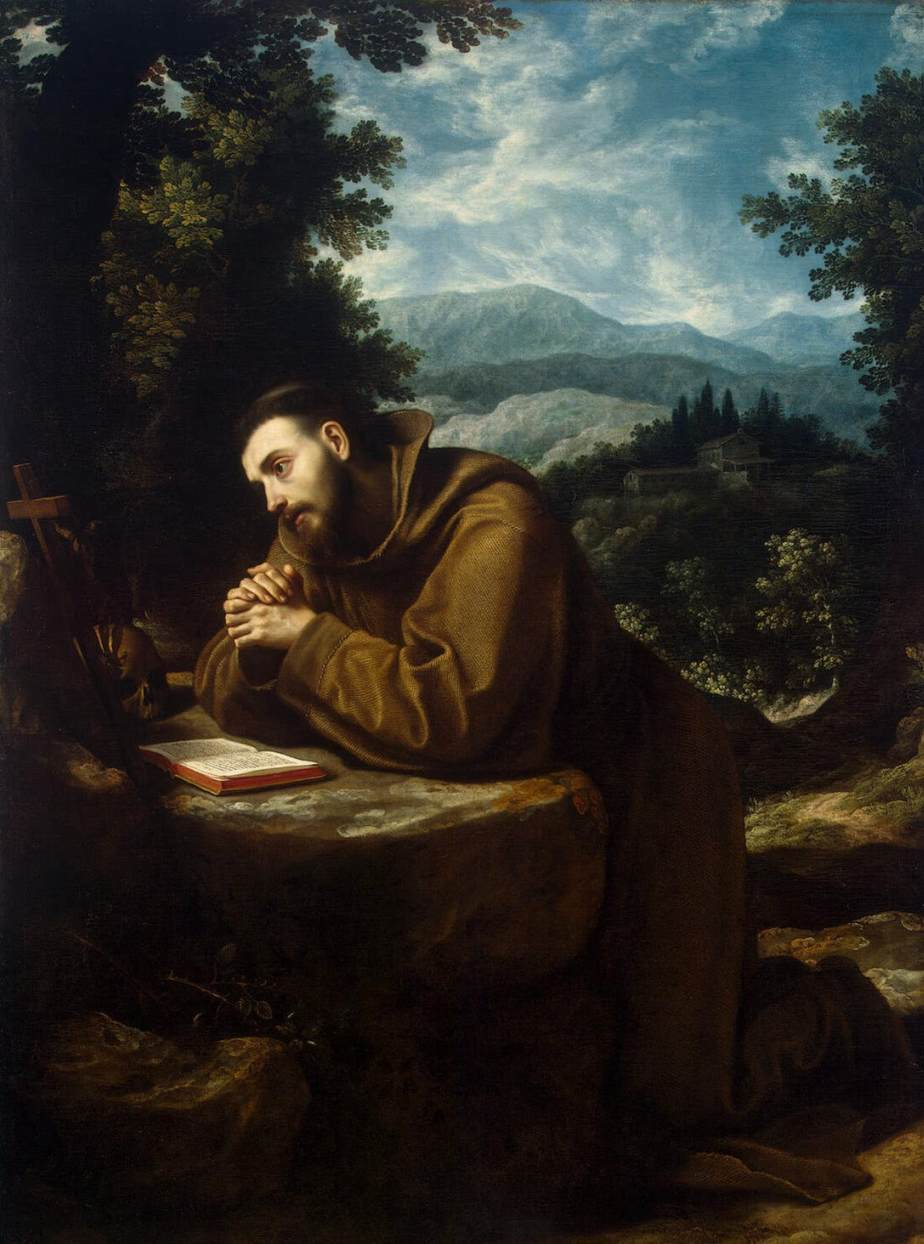
Saint Francis of Assisi contemplating the wounds of stigmata as part of the Imitation of Christ

An individual bearing the wounds of stigmata is a stigmatist or a stigmatic. In Galatians 6:17, Saint Paul says:

Τοῦ λοιποῦ κόπους μοι μηδεὶς παρεχέτω· ἐγὼ γὰρ τὰ στίγματα τοῦ Ἰησοῦ ἐν τῷ σώματί μου βαστάζω.

From henceforth let no man trouble me: for I bear in my body the marks of the Lord Jesus.

A stígma (στίγμα) is a mark on the skin.

Reported cases of stigmata take various forms. Many show some or all Five Sacred Wounds that were, according to the Bible, inflicted on Jesus during his crucifixion: wounds in the wrists and feet, from nails; and in the side, from a lance. Some stigmatics display wounds to the forehead similar to those caused by the crown of thorns. Stigmata as crown of thorns appearing in the 20th century, e.g. on Marie Rose Ferron, have been repeatedly photographed. Other reported forms include tears of blood or sweating blood, and wounds to the back as from scourging.

Many stigmata show recurring bleeding that stops and then starts, at times after receiving Holy Communion; a significant proportion of stigmatics have shown a strong desire to receive Holy Communion frequently. A relatively high percentage of stigmatics also exhibit inedia, claiming to live with minimal (or no) food or water for long periods of time, except for the Holy Eucharist. Some exhibit weight loss, and closer investigation often reveals evidence of fakery.

Some stigmatics claim to feel the pain of wounds with no external marks; these are referred to as "invisible stigmata". Some stigmatics' wounds do not appear to clot, and seem to stay fresh and uninfected. The blood from the wounds is said, in some cases, to have a pleasant, perfumed odor, known as the Odour of Sanctity.

Individuals who have obtained the stigmata are many times described as ecstatics, overwhelmed with emotions upon receiving the stigmata. The Catholic Encyclopaedia stated that no definitive cases are known to have occurred before the thirteenth century.

In his paper Hospitality and Pain, Christian theologian Ivan Illich states: "Compassion with Christ ... is faith so strong and so deeply incarnate that it leads to the individual embodiment of the contemplated pain." His thesis is that stigmata result from exceptional poignancy of religious faith and desire to associate oneself with the suffering Messiah.

Differently from the Five Holy Wounds of Christ, some mystics like Francis of Assisi and father Pio of Petralcina reported a spontaneous regression and closure of their stigmata in the days following their death. Both of them claimed to have received the divine stigmata in their hands as well as in their feet.

== Specific cases ==
=== Saint Ansbert of Rouen ===
Earlier reports of stigmatics do exist, however there is a lack of consensus on how the concept of stigmata was understood pre-Saint Francis. St. Ansbert of Rouen (d. 695 AD) could be considered the earliest stigmatic due to the claims of witnesses following his death, first recorded by an anonymous monk in the mid-8th century AD in Vita Sancti Ansberti:

When they had opened his tomb and they thought his body would stink because of the amount of time that had elapsed since it had been buried, such a sweet fragrant odor like a diversity of flowers flowed forth, and the whole church was filled with little drops of balsam. And when the brothers who had come to see him from the neighboring province... removed the clothes in which he had been buried because they wanted to change them wishing to dress him in new clothes, they found on his forearms the sign of the dominical cross, bearing the likeness of a red color. It was evident to all the faithful that this was given to be understood that while he lived he bore the arms of Christ in his heart, therefore, Christ's stigmata were revealed on the body of the dead man.

=== Saint Francis of Assisi ===
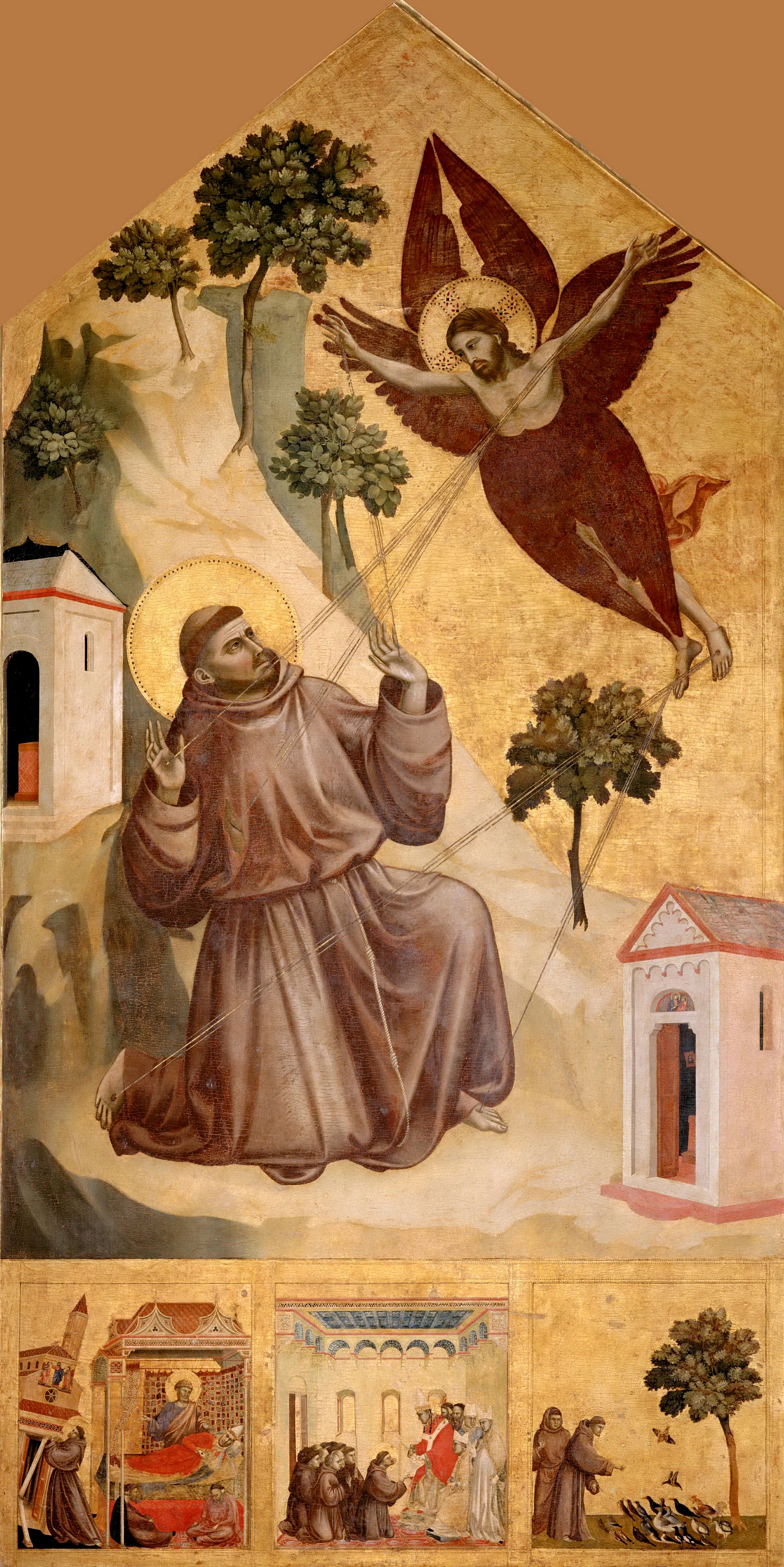
Saint Francis Receiving the Stigmata by Giotto

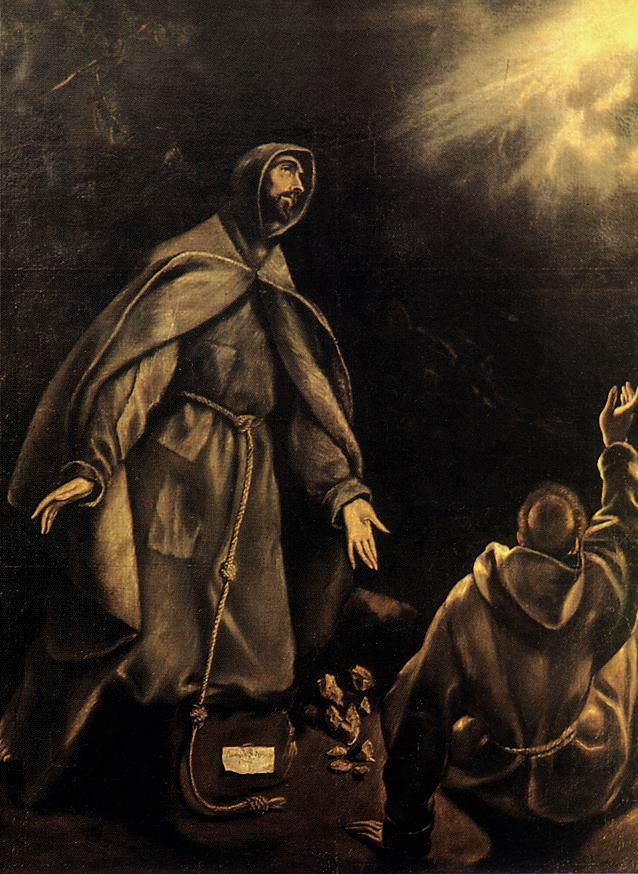
St. Francis of Assisi, by El Greco

St. Francis of Assisi is widely considered the first recorded stigmatic in Christian history. In 1224, two years before his death, he embarked on a journey to Mount La Verna for a forty-day fast. The legend states that one morning, near the feast of the Exaltation of the Cross, a six-winged angel appeared to Francis while he prayed. As the angel approached, Francis could see that the angel was crucified. He was humbled by the sight, and his heart was filled with elation joined by pain and suffering. When the angel departed, Francis was left with wounds in his hands, feet, and side as if caused by the same lance that pierced Christ's side. The image of nails immediately appeared in his hands and feet, and the wound in his side often seeped blood. Pope Alexander IV and other witnesses declared that they had seen these marks both before and after his death. In traditional artistic depictions of the incident, Francis is accompanied by a Franciscan brother.

St. Francis' first biographer, Thomas of Celano, reports the event in his 1230 First Life of St. Francis:

When the blessed servant of God saw these things he was filled with wonder, but he did not know what the vision meant. He rejoiced greatly in the benign and gracious expression with which he saw himself regarded by the seraph, whose beauty was indescribable; yet he was alarmed by the fact that the seraph was affixed to the cross and was suffering terribly. Thus Francis rose, one might say, sad and happy, joy and grief alternating in him. He wondered anxiously what this vision could mean, and his soul was uneasy as it searched for understanding. And as his understanding sought in vain for an explanation and his heart was filled with perplexity at the great novelty of this vision, the marks of nails began to appear in his hands and feet, just as he had seen them slightly earlier in the crucified man above him.

His wrists and feet seemed to be pierced by nails, with the heads of the nails appearing on his wrists and on the upper sides of his feet, the points appearing on the other side. The marks were round on the palm of each hand but elongated on the other side, and small pieces of flesh jutting out from the rest took on the appearance of the nail-ends, bent and driven back. In the same way the marks of nails were impressed on his feet and projected beyond the rest of the flesh. Moreover, his right side had a large wound as if it had been pierced with a spear, and it often bled so that his tunic and trousers were soaked with his sacred blood.

From the records of St. Francis' physical ailments and symptoms, Edward Frederick Hartung concluded in 1935 that St. Francis had an eye ailment known as trachoma and quartan malaria. Quartan malaria infects the liver, spleen, and stomach, causing the victim intense pain. One complication of quartan malaria is known as purpura, a purple hemorrhage of blood into the skin. According to Hartung "If this were the case of St. Francis, he would have been afflicted by ecchymoses, an exceedingly large purpura. The purple spots of blood may have been punctured while in the wilderness and there appear as an open wound like that of Christ."

A later medical hypothesis was proposed in 1987 to explain the wounds, it claimed that St. Francis may have contracted leprosy.

=== Saint Padre Pio of Pietrelcina ===
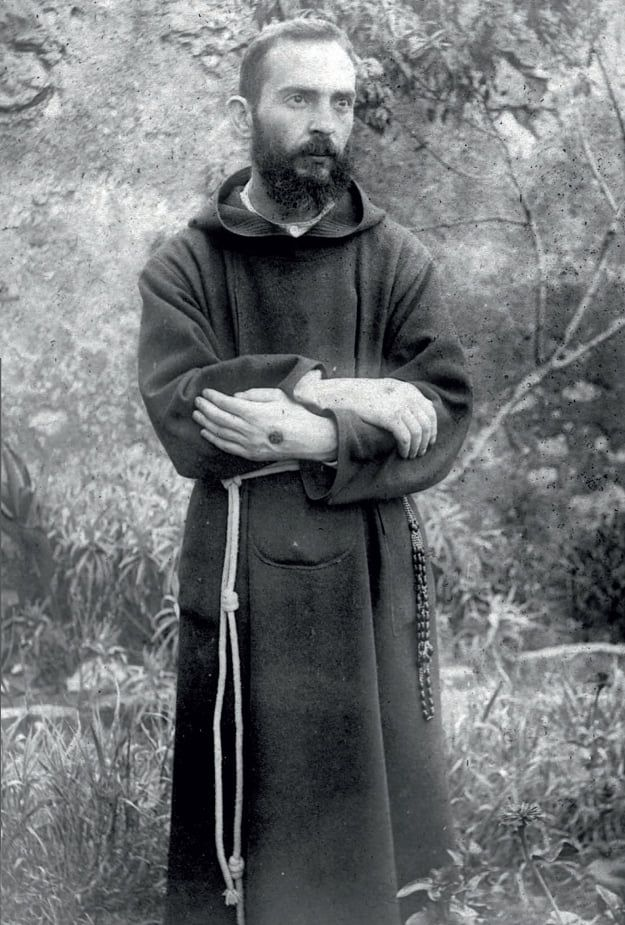
A young Padre Pio showing the stigmata

For over fifty years, Padre Pio of Pietrelcina reported stigmata which were studied by several 20th-century physicians, whose independence from the Church is not known. The observations were reportedly inexplicable and the wounds never became infected. His wounds healed once, but reappeared. The wounds were examined by Luigi Romanelli, chief physician of the City Hospital of Barletta, for about one year. The physician Angelo Maria Merla noted that the wounds were not tubercular in origin but could not make an official diagnosis without further tests. The surgeon Giorgio Festa, a private practitioner, also examined them in 1920 and 1925. Professor Giuseppe Bastianelli, physician to Pope Benedict XV, examined the wounds, but no report of his examinations was made. Pathologist Amico Bignami of the University of Rome also observed the wounds, describing them as shallow. Festa, who had originally agreed with Bignami, later described the wounds as superficial when covered with a scab. Giorgio Festa noted that "at the edges of the lesions, the skin is perfectly normal and does not show any sign of edema, of penetration, or of redness, even when examined with a good magnifying glass". Alberto Caserta took X-rays of the hands in 1954 and found no abnormality in the bone structure. Giuseppe Sala who worked as a physician for Pio between 1956 and 1968 commented that tests revealed his blood had no signs of abnormality.

There were both religious and non-religious critics who accused Padre Pio of faking his stigmata, saying he used carbolic acid to make the wounds. The historian Sergio Luzzatto recounted that in 1919, Maria De Vito (the cousin of the local pharmacist Valentini Vista at Foggia) testified that the young Pio bought carbolic acid and the great quantity of four grams of veratrine "without presenting any medical prescription whatsoever". Pio maintained that the carbolic acid was used to sterilize syringes used for medical treatments and that after being subjected to a practical joke where veratrine was mixed with snuff tobacco, causing uncontrollable sneezing after ingestion, he decided to acquire his own quantity of the substance in order to play the same joke on his confreres.

Amico Bignami in a report wrote that the wounds were caused by "neurotic necrosis". He suggested they had been inflicted unconsciously by suggestion and artificially maintained by iodine that Pio had used as a disinfectant. In 1922, physician Agostino Gemelli went to visit Padre Pio where he observed and interviewed him, but Gemelli was denied the right to physically examine the stigmata without an authorization from the Holy Office. Gemelli, irritated and offended for not being allowed to directly examine the stigmata, wrote while reviewing the previous reports, that Pio was a hysteric and his stigmata were self-induced, not of supernatural origin. Gemelli also speculated that his wounds were kept open with carbolic acid. Giorgio Festa, who examined the stigmata of the friar on October 28, 1919, wrote in his report that they "are not the product of a trauma of external origin, nor are they due to the application of potently irritating chemicals". Pio's case demonstrated that stigmatization provided proofs for believers, but equally for skeptics as it offered evidence to indicate deception was involved in the alleged miracle. Responses to his stigmata embodied polarized views, some held him to be the perfect human being, while others a fraud whose wounds are not a result of devotion, but carbolic acid.

Throughout his life, Pio had hidden his wounds by wearing fingerless gloves. At death there were no wounds, only "unblemished skin". Giacomo Piccirillo the friar commissioned to photograph the deceased body, said on the left palm he saw a small scar and physical residual marks, as if it were a scarred wound that had healed some time ago. Padre Pio had also copied the words of the Italian mystic and stigmatic Gemma Galgani in his spiritual letters, and may have attempted to divert suspicion of his use of her work.

=== Mariam Thresia Chiramel ===
The first saint from India with stigmata was nun Mariam Thresia Chiramel. She was canonised on 13 October 2019 by Pope Francis.

== Stigmata and gender ==
In the late nineteenth century, a French physician named Dr. Antoine Imbert-Goubeyre began compiling a census of known stigmatics from the thirteenth century to his own time. This census includes 280 female and 41 male stigmatics, meaning women comprise a little over 87% of the list. Additionally, the University of Antwerp released a database of information on 244 stigmatics in April 2019. 92% of the stigmatics in the database are female. In some cases, convent sisters have attempted to shield stigmatic women from public scrutiny, often out of fear of how their condition would affect the convent's reputation. So, the number of women stigmatics may be even higher than historical record shows.

Despite the high number of women stigmatics throughout history, the best-known and least contested stigmatics, such as Francis of Assisi and Padre Pio, have been men.

== Scientific research ==
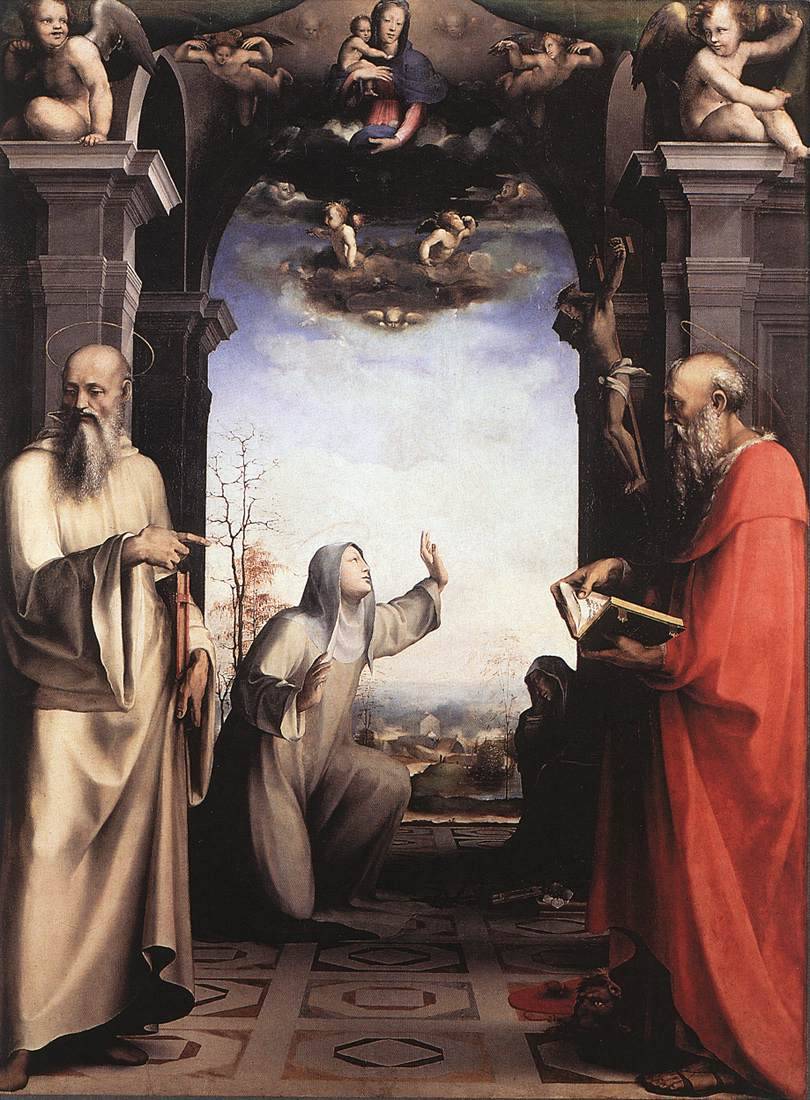
Stigmatization of St Catherine of Siena

Many stigmatics have been exposed for using trickery. Magdalena de la Cruz, for example, confessed before she died that her stigmata was deliberate deception. The Catholic priest Herbert Thurston, attributed the phenomenon and spread of stigmata to suggestion.

Early neurologist Désiré-Magloire Bourneville published works which stated that saints claiming to produce miracles or stigmata, and those claiming to be possessed, were actually suffering from epilepsy or hysteria. Some modern research has indicated stigmata are of hysterical origin or linked to dissociative identity disorder.

There is a link between dietary constriction by self-starvation, dissociative mental states and self-mutilation, in the context of a religious belief. Anorexia nervosa cases often display self-mutilation similar to stigmata as part of a ritualistic, obsessive–compulsive disorder. A relationship between starvation and self-mutilation has been reported amongst prisoners of war and during famines.

The psychologist Leonard Zusne in his book Anomalistic Psychology: A Study of Magical Thinking (1989) has written:

Cases of stigmatism fall into two categories: self-inflicted wounds, which may be either cases of fraud or of unconscious self-infliction, and those that are caused by emotional states ... Self-induced (through autosuggestion) itching and subsequent scratching of which the individual is unaware is likely to occur in suggestible persons if the stimulus is a mental or actual picture of the Crucifixion used during meditation and if the main motive is to receive the stigmata. The motive behind that may be unconscious conflict and a desire to escape from an intolerable situation into invalidism where one's needs are taken care of. It then becomes a case of hysterical conversion reaction. Many cases of stigmatism can be explained as fraud or unconsciously self-inflicted wounds.

In his Stigmata: A Medieval Phenomenon in a Modern Age, Ted Harrison suggests that there is no single mechanism whereby the marks of stigmata were produced. Harrison found no evidence from a study of contemporary cases that the marks were supernatural in origin. He concluded, however, that marks of natural origin need not be hoaxes. Some stigmatics marked themselves in attempt to suffer with Christ as a form of piety. Others marked themselves accidentally and their marks were noted as stigmata by witnesses. Often marks of human origin produced profound and genuine religious responses.

Harrison also noted that after Saint Francis of Assisi, the stigmata was "seen as a predominantly female experience" with the female-to-male ratio of stigmatics being 7 to 1. Those men that were stigmatic were non-ordained, including Saint Francis. Harrison argues that in many cases the stigmata was a consequence of the intense personal mystical ministries practiced by those excluded from the priesthood. Only in the twentieth century have cases of stigmatic priests appeared.

One suggestion is that painful bruising syndrome may explain rare cases of non self-induced stigmata.

Skeptical investigator Joe Nickell who investigated recent cases of stigmata such as Katya Rivas, as well as stigmatics throughout history, commented that the cases are indistinguishable from hoaxing.

In 2002, a psychoanalytic study of stigmatic Therese Neumann suggested her stigmata resulted from post-traumatic stress symptoms expressed in unconscious self-mutilation through abnormal autosuggestibility.

According to a study of the French historian Joachim Bouflet, in the 21st century there were 200 stigmatics all over the world. Most of them reached the third age without having particular health problems. The oldest stigmatic was Marie-Julie Jahenny who died in 1941 at the age of 91. As of 1997, the stigmatics who had been declared saints by the Roman Catholic Church were only 7.

== Non-Christian stigmata ==
Among the Warao of the Orinoco Delta, a contemplator of tutelary spirits may mystically induce the development of "(imagined) openings in the palms of his hands".

Bleeding wounds, described in Western sources as stigmata, are regularly indicated in Buddhist art.

Some spiritualist mediums have also produced stigmata. During the séances of German medium Maria Vollhardt, it was alleged that bleeding wounds appeared. However, Albert Moll, a psychiatrist, considered her phenomena to be fraudulent.

== See also ==
- Dorothy Kerin
- Our Lady of Soufanieh
- Weeping Statues
