= Bastiani =

Bastiani may refer to:

== People ==
- Andrée Ehresmann (born Andrée Bastiani, 1935), French mathematician specialising in category theory
- Giuseppe Bastiani (active in 1594), Italian painter active in the Renaissance period
- Jean-Pierre Bastiani (1950–2021), French politician
- Joseph Bastiani (1843–1924), pioneer of the pineapple trade in Singapore
- Lazzaro Bastiani (1429–1512), Italian painter of the Renaissance
- Monica Bastiani (born 1964), Italian basketball player

== Other ==
- Puerto Bastiani, village and municipality in Chaco Province in northern Argentina

== See also ==
- Synodontis bastiani, species of upside-down catfish native to Côte d'Ivoire and Ghana
