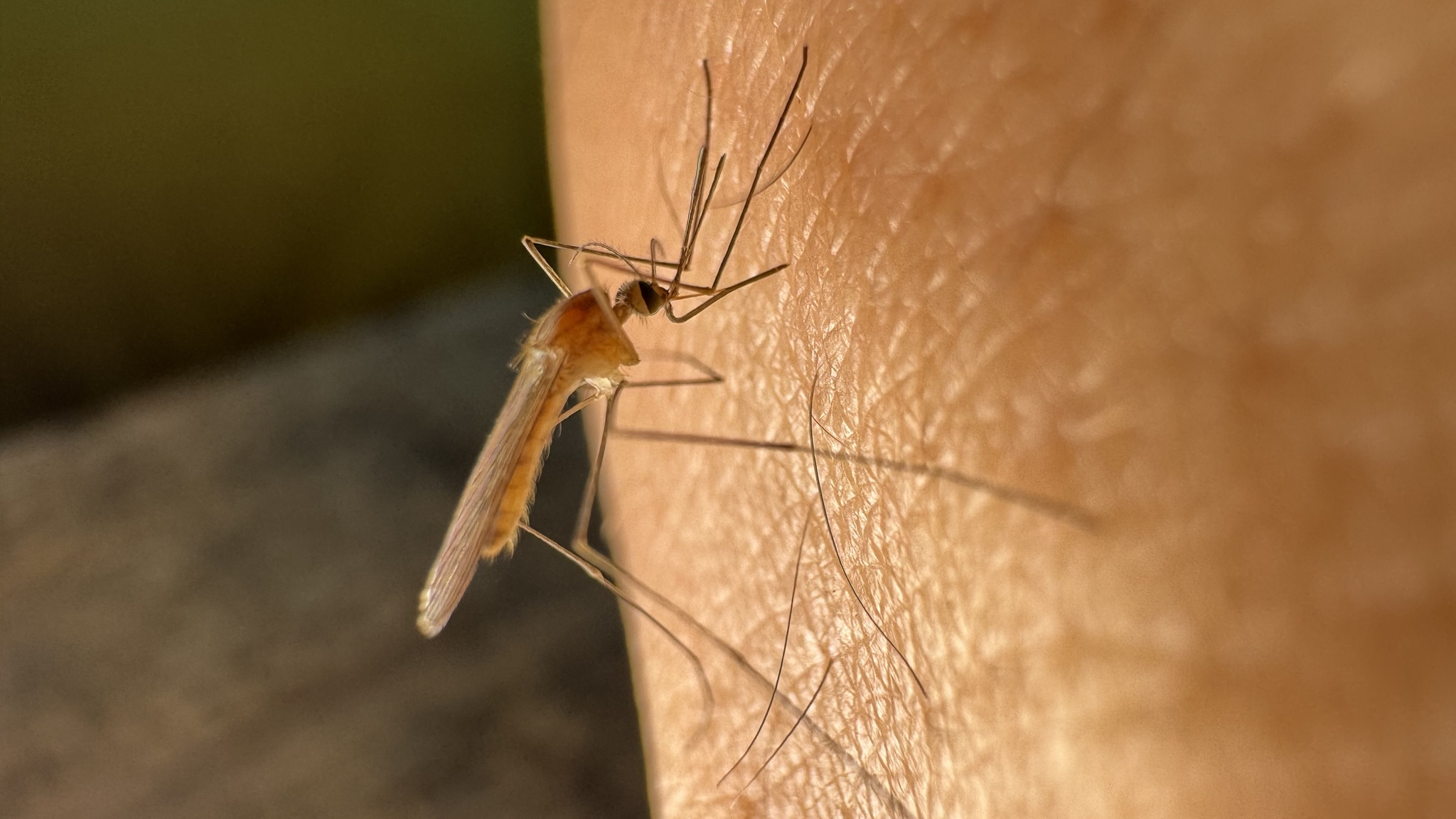

Scientific classification
- Domain: Eukaryota
- Kingdom: Animalia
- Phylum: Arthropoda
- Class: Insecta
- Order: Diptera
- Family: Culicidae
- Genus: Anopheles
- Subgenus: Anopheles
- Species: A. claviger

Binomial name
- Anopheles claviger (Meigen, 1804)

= Anopheles claviger =

Species of mosquito

Anopheles claviger is a mosquito species found in Palearctic realm covering Europe, North Africa, northern Arabian Peninsula, and northern Asia. It is responsible for transmitting malaria in some of these regions. The mosquito is made up of a species complex consisting of An. claviger sensu stricto and An. petragnani Del Vecchio. An. petragnani is found only in western Mediterranean region, and is reported to bite only animals; hence, it is not involved in human malaria.

It was on An. claviger that Giovanni Battista Grassi established the fact that only the female mosquitoes are responsible for transmitting malarial parasite Plasmodium falciparum in humans.

Anopheles claviger was known for breeding abundantly in Åland. As a result, malaria was endemic in the islands for at least 150 years, with severe malaria outbreaks being recorded in the 17th century, and in 1853 and 1862.

== Scientific name ==
Anopheles claviger was first described by Johann Wilhelm Meigen in 1804. However due to its close resemblance with other anopheline mosquitoes, the systematics was variously changed. Originally Meigen named it Culex claviger which he changed it to An. bifurcutus in 1818. This was for a long period the accepted binomial but soon they realised that Carl Linnaeus had already used the name for the males of Culex pipiens. After a decade James Francis Stephens renamed it An. grisescens in 1828. A number of scientific names was introduced after they were discovered from one region after another. Some recognised synonyms are:

- An. amaurus Martini
- An. grisescens Stephens
- An. habibi Mulligan and Puri
- An. missiroli Del Vecchio
- An. pollutus Canamares
- An. turkestani Shingarev
- An. villosus Robineau-Desvoidy

Italian biologists G. Del Vecchio in 1939 and G. Lupascu in 1941 were the first to notice that An. claviger comprised two morphologically distinct species. In 1962 M. Coluzzi revised the taxonomic status by classifying An. claviger as a species complex inclusive of An. petragnani. The species could be identified only on small structural variation in the pupal stages, but is now identified using biochemical and molecular tools.

== Distribution ==
Anopheles claviger is found throughout Palearctic ecozone including Afghanistan, Albania, Armenia, Austria, Azerbaijan, Belarus, Belgium, Bosnia and Herzegovina, Bulgaria, Croatia, Czech Republic, Denmark, Estonia, Finland, France, Georgia, Germany, Greece, Hungary, Iran, Iraq, Ireland, Israel, Italy, Jordan, Kyrgyzstan, Latvia, Lebanon, Lithuania, Moldova, Netherlands, Norway, Pakistan, Poland, Portugal, Romania, Russia, Slovakia, Slovenia, Spain, Sweden, Syria, Tajikistan, Turkey, Turkmenistan, Ukraine, United Kingdom, Uzbekistan, Serbia and Montenegro, extending to Middle East, China and Siberia. Member of the species complex An. petragnani is found only in western Mediterranean including France and Spain, up to Turkey, and absent from beyond.

== Description ==
Female An. claviger is distinguished from other related species from its brownish colour and dark palps. It is also generally larger than others. The proboscis is dark-brown while the antennae are brown. The scales on the wings are dark, evenly distributed without any dark spot. The thorax and abdomen are brown with lighter colour at the posterior end. An. petragnani are generally darker than typical An. claviger. Males are basically similar but have complex arrangements of setae with distinct gonostyle.

== Biology ==
Anopheles claviger adults are most abundant in May and September during which maximum biting on humans takes place. The larval forms are most abundant during cold season from October to the next April. Larvae are generally found in cool and clean water. In the Mediterranean region they are commonly found in wells and water containers (very common in cisterns). In cold area the larvae hibernate during winter but in warmer climate, they do not hibernate although development is slow. Larvae of An. petragnani are slightly different in that they can tolerate higher water temperature. Therefore they can be found during summer under rockholes, ditches, canals and river banks. Mature larvae develop in the eggs 5 to 7 days after oviposition. Most eggs hatch within the next three days, but some may take up to one month. Females of the second generation (September) generally lay fewer eggs than those of the first generation (May). Egg maturation requires blood meal and about six days are required for blood digestion. Females attack human soon after they mate with males. They bite during broad daylight. Females hardly live inside houses so that biting occurs in open places. Unlike other anopheline mosquitoes which deposit their eggs directly on the water surface, female An. claviger lays eggs just above the water level but still in the wet area. They are zoophilic in that they bite mostly of large mammals including humans. There is no report An. petragnani in transmission of human malaria, indicating that they are exclusively zoophilic.

== Scientific importance ==
Anopheles claviger was experimentally used to discover the transmission of human malarial parasite P. falciparum, along with the fact that only female anophelines can transmit malaria. Before 1898 it was not known how malaria was transmitted. The Italian biologist Giovanni Battista Grassi started investigating different mosquito species in the early 1898 on the basis of mosquito-malaria theory. He suspected that only certain species were involved in transmission of malaria. In September Battista reported the presence of malarial parasite in An. claviger indicating it as malaria vector. Battista performed human experimentation on Abele Sola, who had been a patient for six years in the Hospital of the Holy Spirit (Ospedale di Santo Spirito in Sassia) in Rome. With mutual consent Sola was bitten by malaria-infected mosquitoes for ten nights, and after few weeks he was down with tertian malaria. Battista and his colleagues Amico Bignami, Giuseppe Bastianelli and Ettore Marchiafava continued to demonstrate the same experiments in other patients and were always successful. In November they found the parasites on the gut wall of the infected mosquitoes. P. falciparum-carrying mosquito was no doubt the causative vector of malaria. They formally announced the discovery at the session of the Accademia dei Lincei on 4 December 1898. This experiment further established that An. claviger is the sole mosquito species responsible for human malaria in Italy, and other European countries. (In other parts of the world other species of Anopheles are responsible.) In addition the discovery laid the foundation for prevention of malaria by vector control of mosquitoes.
