= Marchiafava–Bignami disease =

Neurological disorder

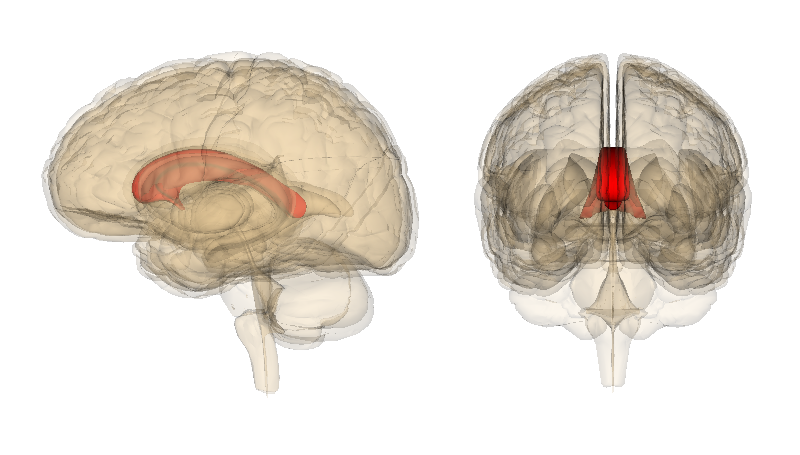
- This condition affects the corpus callosum
- Specialty: Neurology
- Frequency: 0.0001%

Marchiafava–Bignami disease (MBD) is a progressive neurological disease of alcohol use disorder or malnutrition, characterized by corpus callosum demyelination and necrosis and subsequent atrophy. The disease was first described in 1903 by the Italian pathologists Amico Bignami and Ettore Marchiafava in an Italian Chianti drinker. In this autopsy, Marchiafava and Bignami noticed that the middle two-thirds of the corpus callosum were necrotic. It presents in three forms: acute, subacute, and chronic. It is very difficult to diagnose and there is no specific treatment. Until 2008 only around 300 cases had been reported. If the condition is detected early enough, most patients survive.

== Signs and symptoms ==
Signs and symptoms vary depending on the form of the disease and the part of the corpus callous lesioned. Interhemispheric disconnection syndrome is one of the most common symptoms. This syndrome arises from the breakdown of the corpus callosum, which interferes with the communication between hemispheres. Symptoms include dementia, limb apraxia, tactile and unilateral agraphia, and hemialexia. Patients may also present with ataxia, dysarthria, seizures, mutism, and coma in severe or acute cases. In subacute and chronic forms, cognitive decline, memory impairment, and personality changes may be more present. But due to nonspecific symptoms at onset, diagnosis and treatment becomes delayed and difficult.

== Causes ==
MBD is commonly associated with chronic, extreme alcohol consumption, which in turn can lead to thiamine deficiency. Thiamine deficiency is the primary pathological mechanism of MBD, and deficiency disrupts metabolic pathways, hindering myelin synthesis and impairing signal transmission. MBD is also due to a lack of vitamin B_{12} and folate, which contribute to impaired DNA synthesis and myelin maintenance, which leads to white matter degeneration. Chronic alcohol use exacerbates these effects and deficiencies by interfering with thiamine absorption, storage, and utilization, while also exerting neurotoxic effects and promoting oxidative stress. This then results in a wide array of signs and symptoms present in those with MBD.

== Mechanism ==
At the neurobiological level, MBD involves progressive demyelination of the corpus callosum, eventually leading to necrosis and atrophy, specifically in the genu and splenium regions. The acute form involves demyelination in the periventricular region, genu, and splenium, and adjacent white matter of corpus callosum. The chronic form is associated with cystic changes and atrophy of corpus callosum. On MRI, these appear to be hypointense regions on T1-weighted images or hyperintense on T2-weighted or FLAIR images. These cystic changes associated with advanced stage/chronic MBD usually indicated irreversible damage and is associated with a poor prognosis/outcome. Chronic alcohol consumption or nutritional deficiency (thiamine, folate, and vitamin B_{12}) cause metabolic stress on oligodendrocytes. The toxic effect of alcohol and nutritional deficiency causes oligodendrocytes to demyelinate axons and breakdown, which leads to cytotoxic edema and eventually, necrosis of myelin and axons. And in more severe cases, cystic degeneration and atrophy of corpus callosum. Oligodendrocyte dysfunction, and the eventual breakdown of myelinated axons in the corpus callosum, can be caused by a variety and combination of many different mechanisms.

== Diagnosis ==
Marchiafava–Bignami disease is routinely diagnosed with the use of magnetic resonance imaging because the majority of clinical symptoms are non-specific. Before the use of such imaging equipment, it was unable to be diagnosed until autopsy. The patient usually has a history of alcohol use disorder or malnutrition and neurological symptoms are sometimes present and can help lead to a diagnosis. MBD can be told apart from other neural diseases due to the symmetry of the lesions in the corpus callosum as well as the fact that these lesions don't affect the upper and lower edges.

There are two clinical subtypes of MBD. In Type A, stupor and coma predominate. Radiological imaging shows involvement of the entire corpus callosum. This type is also associated with symptoms of the upper motor neurons.

Type B is characterized by normal or only mildly impaired mental status and radiologic imaging shows only partial lesions in the corpus callosum.

== Treatment ==
Treatment is variable depending on individuals. Some treatments work extremely well with some patients and not at all with others. Some treatments include therapy with thiamine and vitamin B complex. Alcohol consumption should be stopped. Some patients survive, but with residual brain damage and dementia. Others remain in comas that eventually lead to death. Nutritional counseling is also recommended. Treatment is often similar to those administered for Wernicke–Korsakoff syndrome or for alcohol use disorder.

Type A has 21% mortality rate and an 81% long-term disability rate. Type B has a 0% mortality rate and a 19% long-term disability rate.

== Research ==
In a study published in 2015, a patient was observed to have MBD, but no history of excessive alcohol use. It is believed that he had protein, folic acid, and thiamine deficiencies, which are what caused the demyelination of the corpus callosum. The patient was diagnosed through magnetic resonance imaging (MRI), but countless other neurological diseases needed to be ruled out initially.

In a study published in 2016, a 45-year-old patient was observed to have taken high amounts of alcohol over 20 years and was malnourished. He was diagnosed with cirrhosis. He was confused and had a lack of motor coordination. He also had altered sensorium and seizures. An MRI was performed and the patient was diagnosed with MBD.

In a study published in 2021, a 52-year-old male with severe alcohol use disorder presented with agitation, impaired attention, imbalance, postural tremor, wide-based gait, and disorientation. Initially, it was believed to be alcohol withdrawal syndrome and treatment with hydration, folic acid, haloperidol, diazepam, and thiamine was ineffective. MRI then showed lesions of the splenium and atrophy in the posterior body of the callosal commissure. After diagnosis of MBD, the patient was given thiamine, B-complex vitamins, and cyanocobalamin. Patient was considered clinically well at 60-month follow up.

== See also ==
- Central pontine myelinolysis
