= Magdalena de la Cruz =

Spanish Franciscan nun (1487–1560)

Magdalena de la Cruz (1487–1560) was a Franciscan nun of Córdoba in Spain, who for many years was honored as a living saint. However, St. Ignatius Loyola had always regarded her with suspicion. Falling dangerously ill in 1543, Magdalena confessed that her stigmata and claims of performing miracles were fraudulent. She was sentenced by the Inquisition, in an auto-da-fé at Córdoba in 1546, to perpetual imprisonment in a convent of her order, and there she is believed to have ended her days.

During the early decades of the sixteenth century she was considered saintly and believed to be in constant and intimate communication with God. Her devotees included the general of the Franciscan Order, Fray Francisco de los Ángeles Quiñones; Fray Francisco de Osuna, the mystic whose writings were so appreciated by Saint Teresa of Ávila; and the archbishop of Seville and inquisitor general, Alonso Manrique. Indeed, on the birth of the future Philip II in 1527, "the hábitos of this nun were sent off as a sacred object so that the infante could be wrapped up in them and thus apparently be shielded and protected from the attacks of the Devil." In 1533 Magdalena was elected abbess of her convent and was at the height of her power and popularity. But only in 1546, and after many false prophecies, visions, and miracles (including a controversial pregnancy), did the Cordoban Inquisition finally try her and sentence her to life imprisonment in a convent in Andújar.

According to Montague Summers, Magdalena went to the "pope (Paul III) as a Penitent, and confessed her sins, that at twelve years old the Devil solicited her, and lay with her, and that he had layen with her for thirty years; yet she was made the Abbess of a Monastery, and counted a saint. [...] She died full of sorrow and deeply contrite, in 1560. It may be remarked that on her confession of imposture and guilt, seventeen years before, the demoniacal stigmata disappeared." The book mentions a Spanish manuscript, kept at the British Museum, and referred to Magdalena de la Cruz, Abbess of the Poor Clares Monastery of St. Isabel of the Angels, which was sentenced by the Holy Inquisition of Cordoba on 3 May 1546.

The Convent of Saint Isabel of the Angels (Spanish: Convento de Santa Isabel de los Ángeles) is located in Cordoba.
