= Mosquito-malaria theory =

Scientific theory

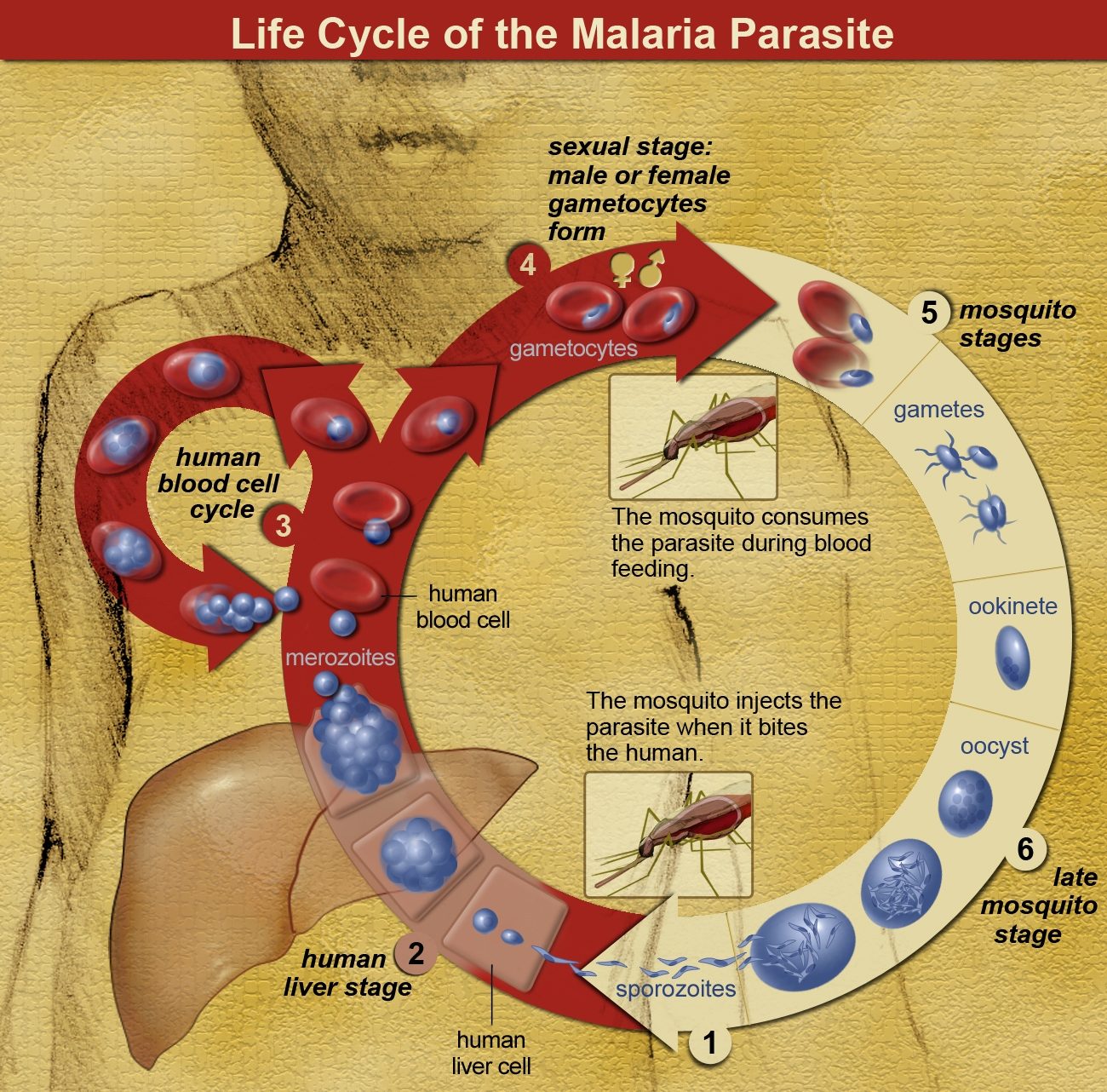
Transmission of malaria parasites between mosquito and human.

The mosquito-malaria theory (or sometimes mosquito theory) was a scientific theory developed in the later half of the 19th century that solved the question of how malaria was transmitted. The theory proposed that malaria was transmitted by mosquitoes, in opposition to the centuries-old medical dogma that malaria was due to bad air, or miasma. The first scientific idea was postulated in 1851 by Charles E. Johnson, who argued that miasma had no direct relationship with malaria. Although Johnson's hypothesis was forgotten, the arrival and validation of the germ theory of diseases in the late 19th century began to shed new lights. When Charles Louis Alphonse Laveran discovered that malaria was caused by a protozoan parasite in 1880, the miasma theory began to subside.

An important discovery was made by Patrick Manson in 1877 that mosquitos could transmit human filarial parasite. Inferring from such novel discovery, Albert Freeman Africanus King proposed the hypothesis that mosquitoes were the source of malaria. In the early 1890s Manson himself began to formulate the complete hypothesis, which he eventually called the mosquito-malaria theory. According to Manson, malaria was transmitted from human to human by a mosquito. The theory was scientifically proved by Manson's confidant Ronald Ross of the Indian Medical Service in the late 1890s. Ross discovered that malaria was transmitted by the biting of specific species of mosquito. For this Ross won the Nobel Prize for Physiology or Medicine in 1902. Further experimental proof was provided by Manson who induced malaria in healthy human subjects from malaria-carrying mosquitoes. Thus the theory became the foundation of malariology and the strategy of control of malaria.

== Early concepts ==
Malaria was prevalent in the Roman Empire, and the Roman scholars associated the disease with the marshy or swampy lands where the disease was particularly rampant. It was from those Romans the name "malaria" originated. They called it malaria (literally meaning "bad air") as they believed that the disease was a kind of miasma that was spread in the air, as originally conceived by ancient Greeks. Since then, it was a medical consensus for centuries that malaria was spread due to miasma, the bad air.

The first record of argument against the miasmatic nature of malaria was from Irish-American surgeon John Crawford, who wrote an article "Mosquital Origin of Malarial Disease" in Baltimore Observer in 1807, but it provoked no consequences. It was instead ridiculed as impossible, and his work has since been lost. An American physician, Charles Earl Johnson, provided a systematic and elaborate arguments against miasmatic origin of malaria in 1851 before the Medical Society of North Carolina. Some of his important points were:

1. The delta of the Mississippi was a recorded healthy place although it has a nearby river, ponds, marshes and much stagnant water.
2. Labourers of North Carolina were the healthiest people of working classes in spite of their constant exposure to swamps, and drinking swamp water.
3. South American countries such as British Guiana and Brazil which were literally flooded with tropical swamps were free from malaria epidemics.
4. Java Island in Southeast Asia, a region known for epidemics, had luxuriant vegetation and agricultural fields, supplemented with hot and wet tropical climate, ideal for miasmatic disease, was but the healthiest part of Asia.
5. A highly polluted River Thames, which should cause miasmatic diseases, was but a good source of drinking water.
6. On the other hand, the driest regions such as Guinea in Africa, Spain, Malta, Gibraltar, and several states of America, were frequented with malarial fevers.

== Scientific grounds ==
=== Disproof of miasma theory of malaria ===
The notion that malaria was due to miasma was negated by the discovery of malarial parasite. A German physician Johann Heinrich Meckel was the first to observe in 1847 the protozoan parasites which he recognised only as black pigment granules from the blood and spleen of a patient who died of malaria. But he did not understand the parasitic nature and significance of those granules in connection with malaria. In 1849 a German pathologist Rudolf Virchow realised that it could be those granules that were responsible for the disease. In 1879 an Italian biologist Ettore Afanasiev further argued that the granules were definitely the causative agents.

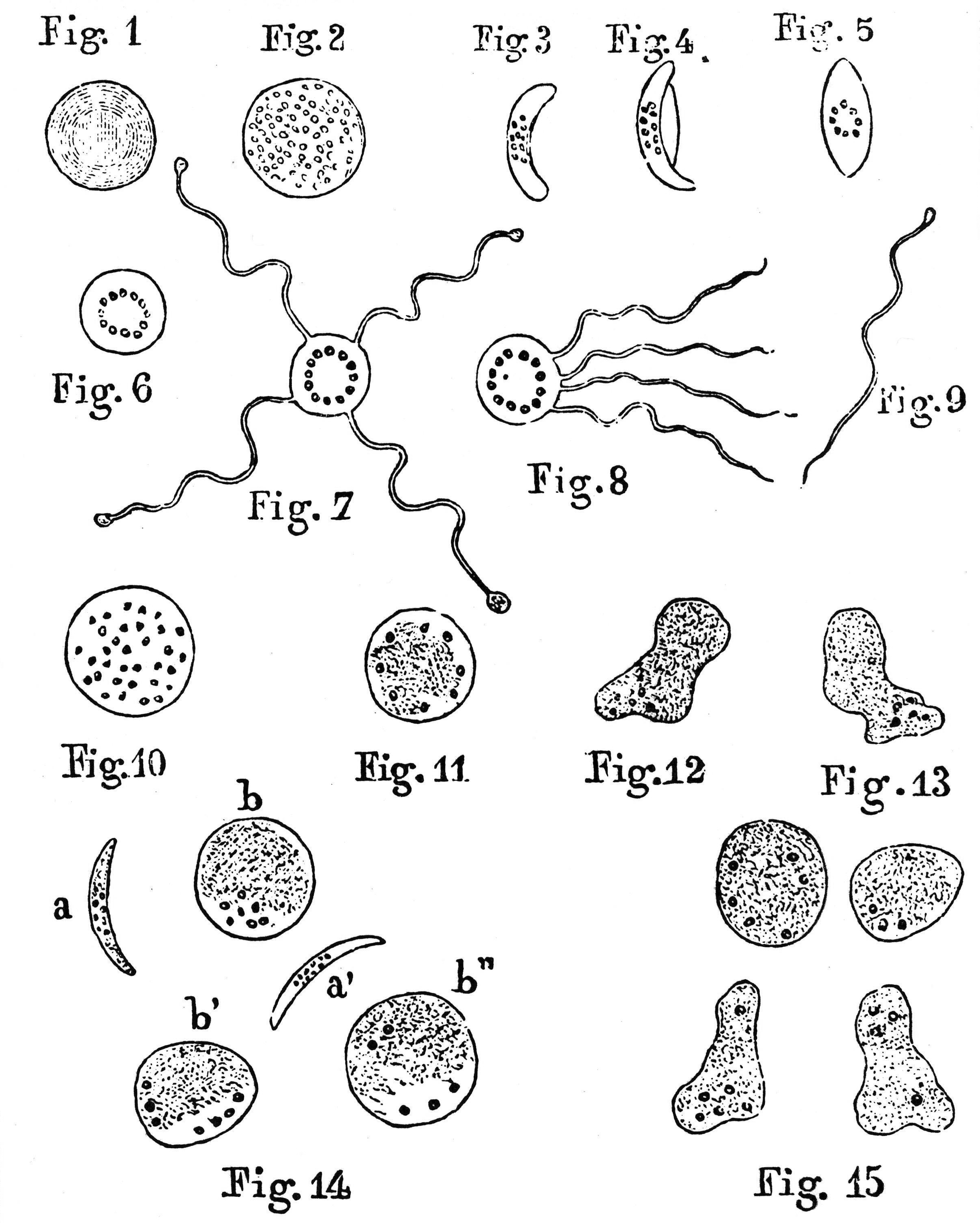
Laveran's drawing of pigmented parasites and the exflagellation of male gametocytes

A major discovery was made by a French Army physician Charles Louis Alphonse Laveran working in Algeria, North Africa. At the hospital in Bône (now Annaba), he noticed spherical bodies from a patient's blood film, free or adherent to red blood cells. On 6 November 1880 he observed from one patient's blood the actual living parasite, describing it as "a pigmented spherical body, filiform elements which move with great vivacity, displacing the neighboring red blood cells." He also observed the process of maturation of the parasite (which is now called exflagellation of microgametocytes). He meticulously examined 200 patients, and noted the cellular bodies in all 148 cases of malaria but never in those without malaria. He also found that after treatment with quinine, the parasites disappeared from blood. These findings clearly indicated that the parasite was the cause of malaria, and establishing the germ theory (nature) of malaria. He named the parasite Oscillaria malariae (later renamed Plasmodium malariae) and reported his discovery to the French Academy of Medicine in Paris on 23 November and 28 December. For his discovery he was awarded the Nobel Prize for Physiology or Medicine in 1907.

=== Discovery of mosquito as disease vector ===
In the early 1880s, Laveran's germ theory of malaria was generally accepted by the science community. However pivotal problems still remained, such as what transmit the malarial parasites and how. The scientific clue emerged when a British medical officer Patrick Manson discovered for the first time that parasites were transmitted by mosquitoes. In 1877 while working in Amoy, a coastal town in China, he found that the mosquito Culex fatigans (now Culex quinquefasciatus) was the vector of the filarial roundworm that he called Filaria sanguinis hominis (but now Wuchereria bancrofti). His findings were published in the China Customs Medical Report in 1878, and relayed by Spencer Cobbold to the Linnean Society in London. This was the first direct evidence that mosquitoes could transmit microscopic parasites in humans, further suggesting that the same could be true in case of malaria.

== King's theory ==
Based on the report of Manson's discovery, an American physician Albert Freeman Africanus King developed a proposition that malaria is transmitted by mosquitoes. He revealed his idea in 1881 to his colleagues C.V. Riley and L.O. Howard, who did not share the same opinion. Unfettered he developed the theory with proper justifications and presented it before the Philosophical Society of Washington on 10 February 1882, under the title "The Prevention of Malarial Disease Illustrating inter alia the Conservative Function of Ague". He went so far as to suggest the complete covering of Washington, DC along the Washington Monument with giant net to protect the city from malaria. His idea was ridiculed as inconceivable as scientists still believed malarial parasite was spread through inhalation or ingestion from air (still not far from the miasma theory). He did not give up, and instead formed a more elaborate argument which he published as a 15-page article in the September 1883 issue of The Popular Science Monthly, making an introduction as:

I now propose to present a series of facts... with regard to the so-called “malarial poison,” and to show how they may be explicable by the supposition that the mosquito is the real source of the disease, rather than the inhalation or cutaneous of a marsh-vapor.

King carefully selected his view in 19 points. To paraphrase his lengthy arguments: occurrence of malaria always coincided with conditions that are also ideal for mosquitos, such as in the time of day, geographical area, temperature, and climate. But the flaw in his proposition was that he believed malaria was transmitted by mosquito through its eggs.

== Manson's theory ==
In 1889 Patrick Manson returned to England and worked at the Seamen's Hospital Society and also as lecturer on tropical diseases in St George's Hospital at London in 1882. His attention was soon drawn towards malaria and began to realise the implications of his own discovery of filarial transmission on malaria. He strongly supported Laveran's germ theory of malaria, which was not yet completely embraced by the entire medical community of the time. He proposed that:

1. malaria is caused by protozoan parasite,
2. the protozoan is transmitted by mosquito, and (falsely)
3. humans are infected from contaminated water in which infected mosquito had died.

Manson was unfortunate that he could not investigate his theory as he was not in malaria endemic country such as India, where it could be experimentally proven. But fortunately he met a British army surgeon Ronald Ross, who was on vacation while serving in the Indian Medical Service in India. In November 1894, he revealed to Ross with his hands on Ross' shoulders, saying, "Do you know, I have formed the theory that mosquitoes carry malaria just as they carry filaria."

Manson formally published his theory in the 8 December 1894 issue of the British Medical Journal. Under the title "On the Nature and Significance of Cresenteric and Flagellated bodies in Malarial Blood", he stated:

[The] mosquito, having been shown to be the agent by which the filaria is removed from the human blood vessels, this or similar suctorial agent must be the agent which removes from the human blood vessels those forms of the malaria organism which are destined to continue the existence of this organism outside the body. It must, therefore, be in this or in a similar suctorial insect or insects that the first stages of the extracorporeal life of the malaria organism are passed... [The] hypothesis I have ventured to formulate seems so well grounded that I for one, did circumstances permit, would approach its experimental demonstration with confidence. The necessary experiments cannot for obvious reasons be carried out in England, but I would commend my hypothesis to the attention of medical men in India and elsewhere, where malarial patients and suctorial insects abound.

== Proof ==
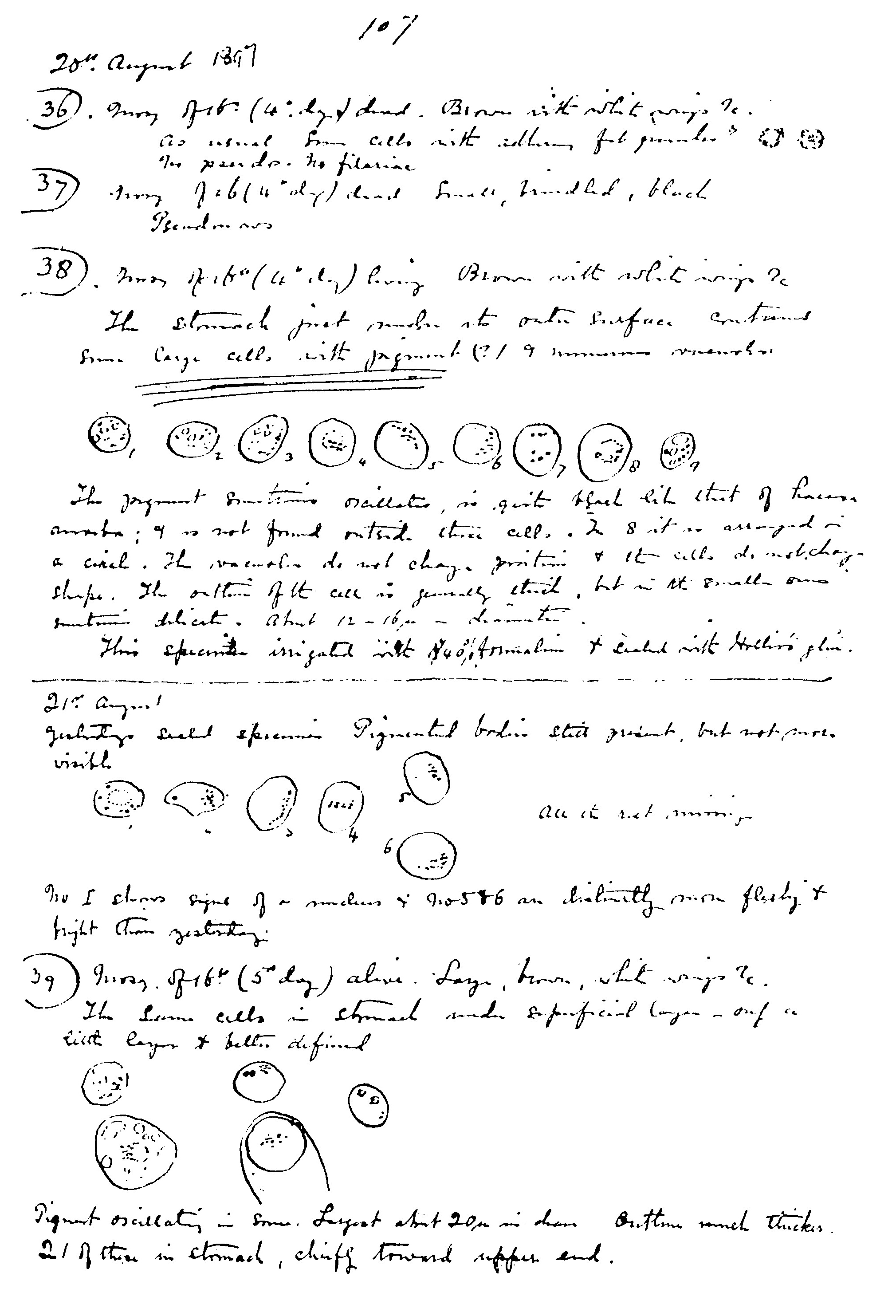
The page in Ross' notebook where he recorded the "pigmented bodies" in mosquitoes that he later identified as malaria parasites

In 1894 Patrick Manson devised an ingenious procedure for detecting malarial parasites at different developmental stages from blood samples. This would later prove to be the tool for experimental proof of his theory. Manson demonstrated to and taught Ronald Ross the technique from which Ross became convinced of Laveran's germ theory. Trained and mentored by Manson, Ross returned to India in March 1895 to start his investigation. But to the dismay of Ross it was not an easy task. His first detection of malarial parasite from patients came only after two months of hard work. The disappointed Ross had to be encouraged by Manson calling the study as the "Holy Grail" of malaria research, and that Ross was the "Sir Galahad".

After one and half years he made no significant progress. On 20 August 1897 he made a momentous discovery that some mosquitoes had malarial parasites in them. He had fed the blood of a malarial patient (Husein Khan) to different groups of mosquitoes four days before, and found that only one type (which he called "brown type" or more commonly "dappled-winged mosquitoes", not knowing the species, which in fact was Anopheles) acquired the malarial parasites in its stomach. This was the first evidence for Manson's theory that mosquito did carry the malarial parasite, and Ross would later famously call 20 August as "Malaria Day" (now adopted as World Mosquito Day).

The second experimental evidence came in the mid-1898 when Ross demonstrated the transmission of bird malaria Proteosoma relictum (now Plasmodium relictum) between larks and mosquitoes, which he called "grey mosquitos" (which were Culex fatigans, but now renamed Culex quinquefasciatus). He showed that the mosquitoes ingested the parasites from infected birds and could infect healthy birds. He further discovered that the parasites developed in the stomach wall and were later stored in salivary glands of the mosquito. This was a conclusive evidence that malarial parasites were indeed transmitted by mosquitoes. In his report Ross concluded that:

These observations prove the mosquito theory of malaria as expounded by Dr Patrick Manson.

On 9 July 1898 Ross wrote Manson:

Q.E.D. and [I] congratulate you on the mosquito theory indeed.

Ross' scientific evidences were soon fortified by Italian biologists including Giovanni Battista Grassi, Amico Bignami, and Giuseppe Bastianelli, who discovered that human malarial parasite was transmitted by the actual biting (disproving one of Manson's hypotheses) of female mosquito. In 1899 they reported the infection of Plasmodium falciparum with the mosquito Anopheles claviger However the practical importance of validating the theory, i.e. control of mosquito vector should be an effective management strategy for malaria, was not realised by the medical community and the public. Hence in 1900 Patrick Manson clinically demonstrated that the bite of infected anopheline mosquitoes invariably resulted in malaria. He acquired carefully reared infected mosquitoes from Bignami and Bastianelli in Rome. His volunteer at the London School of Tropical Medicine, P. Thurburn Manson gave a detailed account of his malarial fevers and treatment after bitten by the mosquitoes. As he summarised, Manson's clinical trial showed that the practical solution to malaria infection was in:

1. avoiding the neighborhood of native houses where mosquitoes are abundant,
2. destroying the habitats of mosquitoes, and
3. protection from mosquito bite.
