= Dorothy Kerin =

English Christian visionary (1889–1963)

- Born: 28 November 1889; Walworth, London, England
- Died: 26 January 1963 (aged 73); At home in Burrswood
- Resting place: Church at Burrswood

Dorothy Kerin (28 November 1889 – 26 January 1963) was an English Christian visionary and healer, and the subject of at least twelve books. Many testimonials show the impact she made on people's lives and wellbeing, one of which was by Marina Alexandrovna Chavchavadze, a Russian princess and long-time companion, who later wrote a book about her life with Kerin.

== Early life ==
Dorothy Kerin was born at 6 Boyson Road, Walworth on 28 November 1889, the second of five children of William Augustus Gerald Patrick Kerin, cargo superintendent, and Emily Jane (née Wilson). She was baptised at St Mary, Newington on 9 March 1890. Dorothy had an older brother (William Albert), two younger brothers (Gerald Wilkinson and Reginald Wykeham) and a sister (Evelyn). Their father "came from an old Irish family which had its roots in Western Ireland...It has been said, with some authenticity, that the Kerins can be traced to William of Wykeham (1324-1404), Bishop of Winchester". The Wykeham name was used several times by Dorothy and other Kerins. Dorothy’s mother came from the musical Wilson family; her three-times great-grandmother was the opera singer Giovanna Sestini.

Kerin stated in her first book that nothing much of interest occurred as she grew up with her siblings. She had a very happy life and then

In the year 1902 my father died, and from this time it was observed that my health was quickly failing. Our family doctor was consulted, and he found that I was extremely delicate and should need close watching and care. For the next four years I was constantly under the care of doctors, and when I was fifteen I sickened with diphtheria, and I was sent to The Grove Isolation Hospital, Tooting.

Soon after William died, the bereaved family moved to 204 Milkwood Road, Herne Hill. After nine months in a sanatorium Dorothy returned home, only to contract pneumonia and pleurisy. "My life was despaired of, and for two weeks I hovered between life and death". She was examined again and bacteriological tests showed that she was suffering from tuberculosis. Kerin remained bedridden for almost the next five years. She was sent to two nursing homes in St. Leonards, "where the doctors were of opinion that unless there was an immediate change for the better, it was impossible for me to live three months. I was suffering from severe haemorrhage from the lungs and internal complications, and in November 1909 I was taken home, as they all thought—to die". During the next three years she was nursed at home, mainly by her mother. She became deaf and blind. Twenty eight doctors had said there was no hope of recovery.

=== Recovery and visions ===
On 4 February 1912, Kerin reported having a religious experience:

On Sunday morning, February 4, at nine o’clock, I received the Blessed Sacrament, and as the priest came towards my bed with the chalice, I saw wonderful golden light radiating from it, which enveloped the priest. I had never seen this before, though all through my illness I had made my Communion every month. It was a beautiful experience, and the Divine Presence was indeed a reality.

In the evening she asked her sister Evelyn to sing "Abide with Me". She didn’t know it well enough to sing, but as she sat by Dorothy’s side they both “heard it sung from beginning to end most beautifully”. Dorothy then described how she seemed to drift into space, free from pain, and saw a group of angels, one of whom handed her a chalice, from which she drank. After travelling a great distance she came to a place where she heard her name called and an angel took her hand and said “Dorothy, your sufferings are over. Get up and walk.” He passed his hands over her eyes and touched her ears, and then she opened her eyes and found herself sitting up in bed. Her mother and a number of friends, sixteen people in all, were standing round the bed, looking very frightened. She was given a dressing gown, got out of bed and walked unaided.

Though I had not walked for five years, I now walked quite steadily, and was not the least bit shaky; indeed I felt so well and strong that I might never have been ill at all. Very soon I realised that I was hungry, and asked for food. They brought me milk in a feeding-cup, but I refused it, and finally I went down myself the two flights of stairs to the larder and brought back the materials for a real meal of meat and pudding. How I enjoyed that meal!

She went back to bed at midnight and slept until eight o’clock the following morning. Her body had become plump and firm and she could see and hear. Dr Norman was sent for and, after examining her, asked her to go up a steep flight of stairs to test her muscles. "When he saw me run up them, he slapped his head and said, 'Great God, what is the meaning of it all?'" The newspapers were soon reporting the story. Three days after her healing, Kerin was invited by Dr Edwin Lancelot Ash to his house, to “receive the necessary rest and quiet”. While there, she had another vision:

On Sunday, March 11, I was wakened out of sleep by a voice saying, “Dorothy.” I sat up, and saw at the foot of my bed a wonderful light, out of which came the face of a beautiful woman holding a lily. She came very near to me and said: “Dorothy, you are quite well now. God has brought you back to use you for a great and privileged work. In your prayers and faith many sick shall you heal; comfort the sorrowing and give faith to the faithless. Many rebuffs will you have, but remember you are thrice blessed: His grace is sufficient for thee. He will never leave thee.” After making the sign of the Cross over me with her lily, the figure disappeared.

Kerin reported some instances of Angel protection which then followed. In October 1912 she took a motor bus, intending to visit a sick woman in Kennington. She was going up the steps when quite unexpectedly the bus gave a lurch forward and flung her into the road. The base of her spine struck the curb, and “I felt a horrible numbness creeping over me”. Suddenly she found herself enveloped in a beautiful blue light and distinctly heard a voice cry, “God is Love.” She was lifted by unseen hands on to the platform of the bus, and ran upstairs to the top. She reassured the conductor that she was not the least bit hurt and continued her journey in comfort.

She went on to record further events where she was similarly "rescued", including a second incident with a bus; an inability to speak before a congregation at Monkwearmouth and recovery after a mugging in Paignton.

== Healing ==
From 1914, Kerin found that she had healing powers herself. During a visit to the Church of St. Mary Brookfield in Hampstead, Kerin was awakened by a voice calling her to arise to answer the call, which seemed to come from the church. There she found three sick people "for whom I had been asked to pray". At the prayer of consecration there arose from the chalice

a deep mauve and blue mist, materialising into a great cross. Slowly a form appeared upon the cross, and in the centre of the outstretched hands glowed two red spots. I held the three sick ones before Him again, and heard Him say, "It is finished." Then the vision slowly vanished…the three sufferers were completely healed from this time.

In her book Fulfilling, Kerin describes how, from 1915-1929, she lived in simple vows under the direction of Dr Langford-James. He was vicar of St Mark’s, Bush Hill Park in north London. He was well versed in mystical and ascetical theology particularly in the Carmelite school; and Dorothy lived in the vicarage through the London bombings of WW1 and beyond.

=== Stigmata ===
On 8 December 1915, Kerin reported experiencing great pain in her left hand; she showed the wound on her palm to Langford-James. The next afternoon she received the wound in her side, and then in her right hand. On the 10th she was given the wounds in her feet. Over the next few weeks the wounds gradually healed, although they were to open up on occasions during the next six years. Kerin was most reluctant to let anyone except for Langford-Jones see the wounds, but he eventually persuaded her to let in witnesses to the stigmata.

== Homes of Healing ==
In 1929 Kerin left Bush Hill Park and opened her first residential home of healing (St Raphael’s, a rented house in Ealing, west London)” which Dorothy described as being “a modest house, containing ten rooms, in Culmington Road, Ealing. It was dedicated to God as a thanksgiving for my Healing, by Bishop Boutflower.” There was much to be done to make it usable, including repairs, alterations and furnishings. But where was the money to come from? “I did not know” said Kerin, "Of one thing only was I certain, that God had shown me that he wanted it". Somehow, gifts arrived, offers of help and loans of furniture appeared and then the house was ready. It was soon "full to overflowing with those who came seeking healing, of body and mind". Clearly, more space was required.

=== Chapel House ===
While walking her dog one day, on the way to Walpole Park, Kerin was drawn to investigate Chapel House, a derelict structure that she had passed many times. She became convinced that it was “God’s House, planned and prepared by Him, for work He meant to do there … He commanded ‘Get it for Me’ “. Financially, the whole thing looked impossible: the asking price was £5,000, there was little in the bank, and St Raphael’s was kept going with various gifts and offerings; but on hearing of the plan proposed for the house, the owner immediately reduced the price to £3,700. A few days later a friend wrote “My dear, I have received some unexpected dividends, and feel God asks me to send it to you. I have no doubt you will soon find some good use for it.” Despite this gift, more money was required and, once again, donations, more gifts and a bank loan came to the rescue. By the middle of October 1929 the house was ready, and was dedicated by the Bishop of Woolwich.

Evelyn wrote "Our two elder brothers had now married, and mother and Reginald went to live at Chapel House with Dorothy". During a visit the Chapel House to see a patient, Dr Hopewell-Ash asked Dorothy about the financial situation. He insisted that she take immediate steps for it to be registered as a Nursing Home, charging proper fees. The licence was granted, and a brochure prepared, listing those willing to be sponsors. These included the Archbishop of Canterbury, the Orthodox Archbishop of Corinth, the Bishop of London and many clergy and doctors. The home entered a new phase, and prospered. Rose Friend, a nurse, arrived as a patient and stayed as Matron, and showed a complete devotion to Dorothy.

Such was the growth in people wanting to be healed the Chapel House could barely accommodate them. The next door house was acquired, then another, until the whole block on one side of Mattock Lane became Chapel House, made up of seven former dwellings.

=== Adopted children ===
Dorothy Kerin, who never married, adopted nine children in 1941-1942, all of whom had been made orphans by the Second World War. In late 1945 they were:

- Twins Faith Wykeham and Mary, age five
- Twins John and Francis, four-and-a-half
- Anne and Elizabeth, four
- Peter, Priscilla and Philip Wykeham, three.

Apart from a short break at a furnished cottage found by an old friend in Burnham, to escape the bombing in Ealing, they all lived at first at Chapel House and were looked after by a nurse, a nursery-maid and a governess. All the children were given an excellent education and, in 1963 when Dorothy died eight of them, aged between 20 and 22, attended the funeral; one daughter was in Australia.

There were occasional newspaper reports mentioning several of the children:

- In 1960 The Times announced the engagement between John Thayer Griffiths and Faith Kerin, adopted daughter of Miss Dorothy, of Burrswood, Groombridge, Kent". No record of that marriage has been found. However, Faith married Robert Edmund Upton at the Church of Christ the Healer, Burrswood on 17 August 1963. She was given away by Philip Kerin, and was attended by her twin sister Mary. The ceremony was conducted by The Bishop of Tonbridge, the Right Rev. Russell B White. The couple had two children. By 1966 Faith Wykeham Upton was in Cammeray, a suburb of Sydney, while Robert served in the Royal Australian Navy. By 1975 she was in Paraparaumu, New Zealand, listed as a receptionist secretary. There is no further record of her after 1978.
- Priscilla Kerin (also recorded as Joan P) married John W McKee in Kensington in April 1963
- A dramatic incident was reported in 2004 involving the rescue of a yachtsman: Philip Kerin, aged 62, from Groombridge, near Tunbridge Wells.
- In a 1963 article about a legal dispute over the status and future of Burrswood, Anne and Elizabeth were described as "21-year-old secretaries" and Francis as a "23-year-old assistant master at Canterbury Cathedral choir school".
- Eight of the nine children were still alive in 2012; Anne had died, although it is not known when or where.

=== Etherton Hall ===
Just after the war Evelyn recounted that "The children proved to be very self-willed, and a stream of governesses and helpers found nine too many to manage. Perhaps Ealing was not the best place to bring them up?" Kerin discussed this with the Bishop of St Albans, Philip Loyd, who agreed that a move to the country would be a good idea. A visitor to a patient at Chapel House mentioned to the Matron that she and her father, Mr Modin, had a large house in Speldhurst, Kent. It had been occupied by the military during the war, and left in a very poor state. The Modins wished to be dedicated to Spiritual Healing. Dorothy visited Etherton Hall, agreed to take it, and work began. The move from Ealing was made in 1946. It was blessed by the Bishop of St Albans on 28 September, and renamed Chapel House in 1948.

=== Burrswood ===
Kerin spent a lot of time travelling to and from Ealing, administering to patients there as well as in Speldhurst. Her children missed her. She was seriously considering whether to move again, when the Archdeacon of London "asked if he might make an offer for Chapel House, to be used as a Diocesan House". Dorothy took this as a sign, and started looking for suitable accommodation. Eventually she found what is now known as Burrswood, in Groombridge, a village which straddles the border between Kent and East Sussex, not far from Tunbridge Wells. she decided to buy the property even though it was in appalling condition. There were, as ever, financial complications which ended in her selling all the Ealing properties to Middlesex County Council. When work at Burrswood was sufficiently complete for some of it to be used, it opened in 1948; the Bishop of St Albans blessed the chapel and house on 15 September, and dedicated it to St Michael.

Ten years later, Kerin was certain that a church needed to be built at Burrswood:

In 1958 Miss Kerin said that she had a vision that a church must be built in the grounds, where she could intensify her ministry. The money was soon forthcoming, and on May 14 1960, a church was consecrated, free of debt, by the Bishop of Coventry (Dr Cuthbert Bardsley), assisted by the Bishop of Lewes. It was the first church ever to be built within the Church of England for the specific purpose of exercising the ministry of healing.

It was named the Church of Christ the Healer. The Breakthrough Cross, on the roof of the Lady Chapel at the church, was created by Ophelia Gordon Bell in 1966.

==== Le Monnaie, Guernsey ====
In the 1950s, Robin, the 24 year-old son of the Rev Frank Drake of Guernsey was diagnosed with Hodgkin lymphoma, which was incurable at the time. Frank Drake and his wife were in touch with Dorothy Kerin and they persuaded Robin to spend six months at Burrswood. "Robin returned to Guernsey in June 1955 with Dorothy, Princess Marina Chavchavadze and one of Dorothy's adopted children, Philip Kerin". The Rev Drake took Dorothy to the spot at Le Monnaie where he had had a visionary experience regarding the establishment of a chapel on the site. Her response was immediate and most definite: 'I have never been more sure of anything in my life that God wants a chapel built here, now,' she said. Drake "engaged an architect ... to prepare plans and a few days later a benefactor came forward with an offer to underwrite the full cost of the project. Within a year the chapel had been completed". It is still in use.

Kerin had long felt a calling to spread the word about Divine Healing further afield. After a couple of visits to Sweden and one to Ireland she undertook a "month's visit to the United States, under the sponsorship of the Rev. Dr Alfred W Price, rector of St Stephen's Episcopal Church, Philadelphia"; she was accompanied by Dorothy Musgrave Arnold (who later wrote a book about Kerin). They sailed First Class on the Queen Elizabeth, leaving on 29 September 1961 and arriving at New York on 3 October. They visited New York, Philadelphia, Washington, Richmond, Jamestown, Williamsburg, Westover, Norfolk, Baltimore, Boston, Providence, Newport and East Islip, with Kerin often giving two talks in one day, in what proved to be a very tiring trip.

== Death and legacy ==
At Christmas time 1962 Kerin showed signs of illness. These worsened and by 24 January 1963 she was unconscious. She died the morning of 26 January, "leaving neither a will nor a trust deed". She was buried in the church at Burrswood. The Bishop of Coventry wrote an obituary in The Times.

A Trust was set up soon after Kerin's death. Its legal advisers took six years to resolve the issues resulting from the absence of proper paperwork. The healing centre was then able to keep going until it ran out of funds and went into administration in 2019. Three years later planning permission was received from Tunbridge Wells Borough Council for "conversion of the former Christian centre and care home Burrswood into 72 flats". In 2024 plans were lodged for the "adaptation and conversion of two buildings at Burrswood in Groombridge, to create three homes".

In 2012, forty four years after her death, Dr. Stevens Heckscher wrote

Dorothy Kerin was a most extraordinary figure in the Christian world of the twentieth century. In the ancient church, she would have been ranked among the greatest saints. In her own Anglican tradition, during her lifetime she was considered a pioneer in the recovery of the healing ministry, and a gifted, charismatic healer. Through personal contacts, her prayers, her writings, and writings about her, she touched and changed the lives of many thousands in her native England, and beyond its shores. Yet today, forty-four years after her death in 1963, she is nearly forgotten.

== Bibliography ==
Books about Dorothy Kerin

- Ash, Edwin Lancelot (1912). Faith and suggestion : including an account of the remarkable experiences of Dorothy Kerin. London: Herbert & Daniel.
- Kerin, Dorothy (1914). The Living Touch. London: G Bell & Sons, Ltd.
- Ross, James Davidson (1958). Dorothy Kerin: a Portrait. Hodder and Stoughton.
- Kerin, Dorothy (1963) [First printed 1952]. Fulfilling: A sequel to "The living touch". Hodder and Stoughton.
- Waterfield, Evelyn (1964). My sister Dorothy Kerin, born November 28th, 1889, died January 26th, 1963. London: A R Mowbray & Co.
- Arnold, Dorothy Musgrave (1966). Called by Christ to Heal; the story of Dorothy Kerin. New York: Seabury Press.
- Kerin, Dorothy; Dorothy Kerin Trust (1973). The Church of Christ the Healer. Groombridge: Dorothy Kerin Trust.
- Ernest, Johanna (1975). The teaching of Dorothy Kerin. Tunbridge Wells: J Ernst.
- Furlong, Monica (1978). Burrswood, focus of healing. London: Hodder and Stoughton.
- Ernest, Johanna (1983). The Life of Dorothy Kerin. Burrswood: Dorothy Kerin Trust.
- Ernest, Johanna (1987). Dorothy Kerin, 1889-1963. Burrswood: Dorothy Kerin Trust.
- Chavchavadze, Marina (1995). Dorothy Kerin as I knew her. Executors of the Estate of Marina Chavchavadze.
- Maddocks, Morris (1999). The Vision of Dorothy Kerin. Guildford: Eagle.
