= Synodontis bastiani =

Conservation status
- Least Concern (IUCN 3.1)

Scientific classification
- Domain: Eukaryota
- Kingdom: Animalia
- Phylum: Chordata
- Class: Actinopterygii
- Order: Siluriformes
- Family: Mochokidae
- Genus: Synodontis
- Species: S. bastiani

Binomial name
- Synodontis bastiani Daget, 1948

Species of fish

Synodontis bastiani is a species of upside-down catfish native to Côte d'Ivoire and Ghana where it occurs in the Sassandra, Bandama and Bia basins and the Comoe and Agnébi Rivers. This species grows to a length of 20.1 centimetres (7.9 in) SL.
