= Puerto Bastiani =

Coordinates: 27°18′01″S 59°06′34″W

- Municipality and village
- Interactive map of Puerto Bastiani
- Country: Argentina
- Province: Chaco Province
- Time zone: UTC−3 (ART)

Puerto Bastiani is a village and municipality in Chaco Province in northern Argentina.
