= Corrado Tommasi-Crudeli =

Italian physician

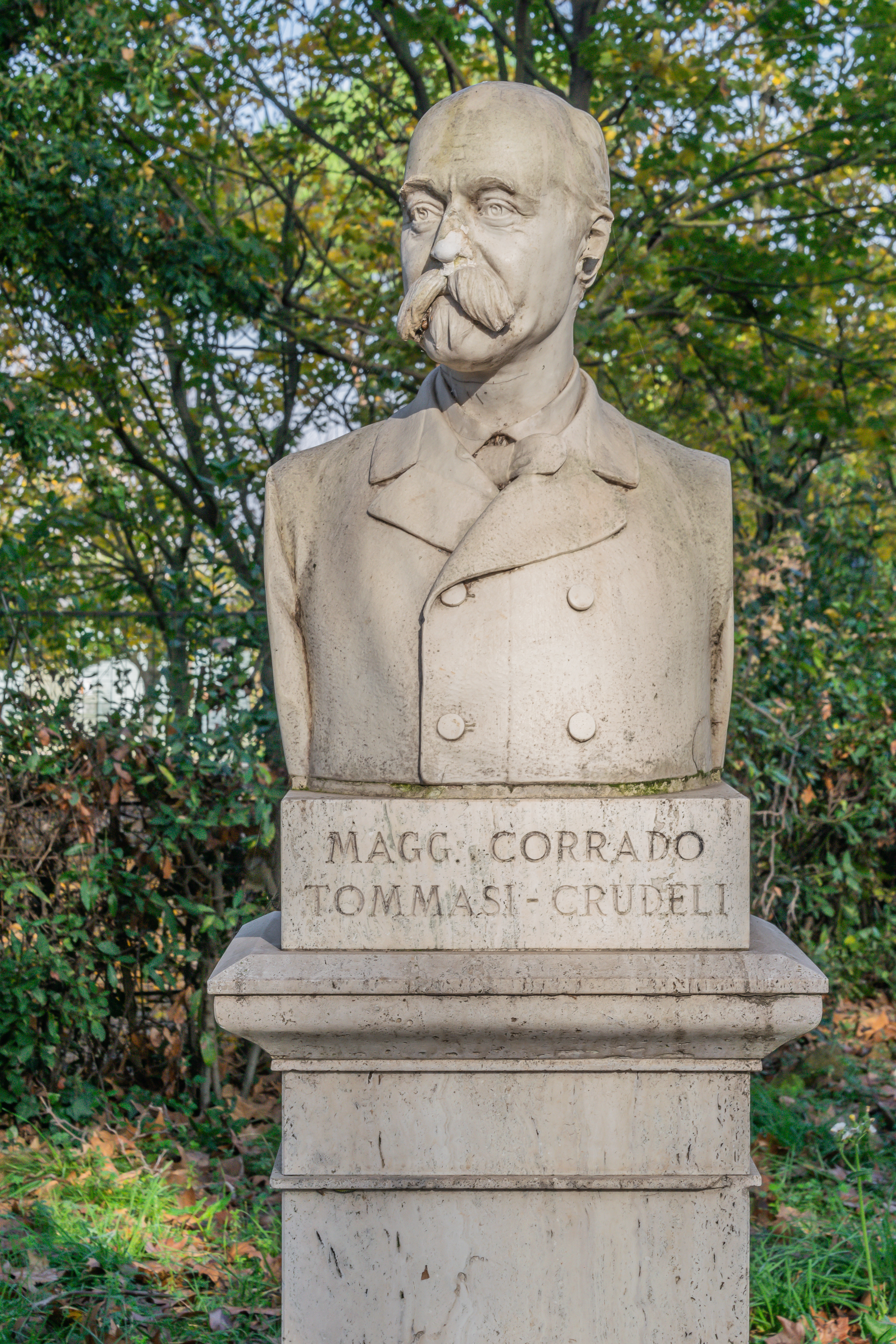
- Bust of Tommasi-Crudeli at Gianicolo park in Rome
- Born: 31 January 1835; Pieve Santo Stefano, Tuscany, Italy
- Died: 31 May 1900 (aged 65); Rome
- Citizenship: Italian
- Education: University of Pisa
- Spouse: Bianca Fontini
- Scientific career
- Fields: Medicine, pathology
- Workplaces: Sapienza University of Rome

Senator Corrado Tommasi-Crudeli

Senato del Regno
- In office 10 October 1892 – 29 November 1893
- President: Domenico Farini
- Constituency: Rome

Corrado Tommasi-Crudeli (31 January 1834 – 31 May 1900) was an Italian physician known for his work in pathology and hygiene. He studied for his medical degree at the University of Pisa. He was trained in pathology under the German pathologist Rudolf Virchow. He worked in medical services at Florence, Palermo, and Rome. He was Chair of Pathology at the Sapienza University of Rome. He was known to the public for his service during a cholera outbreak and in establishing hospitals, particularly the Institute for Experimental Hygiene (Istituto di Igiene Sperimentale) in Rome. He was elected to the Italian Senate during 1892–1893. He, with Edwin Klebs, discovered that typhoid and diphtheria were caused by bacteria. However, they made a mistake in declaring that a bacterium (which they called Bacillus malariae) was also responsible for malaria.

== Biography ==
Tommasi-Crudeli was the eldest son of Peter Tommasi (the surname Tommasi-Crudeli was adopted later) and Elisa Gatteschi. His father was a Medical Officer at Pieve Santo Stefano, and his mother a landowner. He had three brothers, Stefano, Eugenio, and Adele. He completed medical course and obtained MD degree from the University of Pisa. He went to France and Germany to have further training in pathology and worked with Rudolf Virchow at the University of Berlin. In 1859 the Second Italian War of Independence broke out which prompted Tommasi-Crudeli to go home and fight for his country. He volunteered as army physician, and was posted as lieutenant doctor among the troop called Hunters of the Apennines under the command of Giuseppe Garibaldi. He was wounded at the war front in Milazzo, and then again at Messina. By the end of the Third Italian War of Independence in 1866 his bravery had earned him Honorary Major of the 77th infantry. In 1866 he was designated by the Italian government to control an outbreak of cholera in Palermo, where the disease was rampant among the soldiers. He was successful.

In between the wars, in 1864 Tommasi-Crudeli was appointed Professor of Anatomy at the Institute of Florence. The following year, he became chair and Professor of Pathological Anatomy at the University of Palermo. He taught there till 1870. In 1870 he was offered a post at the newly established Physiological and Pathological Institute of the University of Rome. He became Director and Professor of Pathological Anatomy until his retirement in 1886. He continued as Professor Emeritus to his last day.

He was elected member of Senate of the Kingdom of Italy in 1892 and served as member of the Standing Committee on Finance.

Tommasi-Crudeli married Bianca Fortini (who died at the time of Palermo cholera outbreak), but they had no children. He remarried Sophia Ingham-Whitaker, who predeceased him just before his own death.

== Honours and recognitions ==
Tommasi-Crudeli was decorated with Silver Medal of Military Valour for his service in the Italian Army. He was appointed Director of The Courier Sicilian during 1868 to 1869. He was elected Member of the Society of Medical Physics of Florence in 1862, Extraordinary member of the Higher Council of Education (during 1871 to 1873, and 1874 to 1881), National member of the Accademia dei Lincei on 2 January 1874. He became Member of the Higher Council of Education between 1893 and 1897, and between 1898 and 1900. He was founder of several hospitals in Palermo, the Hospital of Alcamo, Villa Sofia, dell'Istituto fisiopatologico di Spirito (Institute of Pathophysiology of the Holy Spirit in 1871), and the Institute of Experimental Hygiene at University of Rome (in 1883). He was Director of the Institute of Experimental Hygiene, University of Rome from 1883 to 1886. But the institute was officially inaugurated only in 1885 when a separate building was opened at Viminale Square. He was conferred Knight of the Order of Savoy Civil on 20 February 1898.

== Bacillus theory of malaria ==
Tommasi-Crudeli, along with German pathologist Edwin Klebs, made several discoveries that bacteria caused diseases such as typhoid and diphtheria. They discovered a new bacterium from mud and waters in 1879. This was the period of intense research for discovery of the causative agent and transmission of malaria. They found the short rod-shaped bacillus while investigating Roman Campagna. They believed that the bacteria was the pathogen for malaria as they discovered from damp soil in the region of malaria epidemics. They further claimed that through experimental injection in rabbits, the bacterium produced symptoms of malaria such as enlargement of spleen and fever. They theorised that malaria was spread by drinking bacteria-contaminated water or inhalation from air. They even gave the scientific name Bacillus malariae. Klebs reported that antimalarial drug quinine killed the germ. The discovery was supported by leading malariologists of the time. When the news spread, it was declared that the malaria problem was solved. But an American physician George Miller Sternberg proved that the bacillus did not cause specific symptoms of malaria in 1881. The bacillus theory was eventually proved wrong by the experimental demonstration of the mosquito-malaria theory in 1898.
