= Ettore Marchiafava =

Italian scientist (1847–1935)

Ettorre Marchiafava
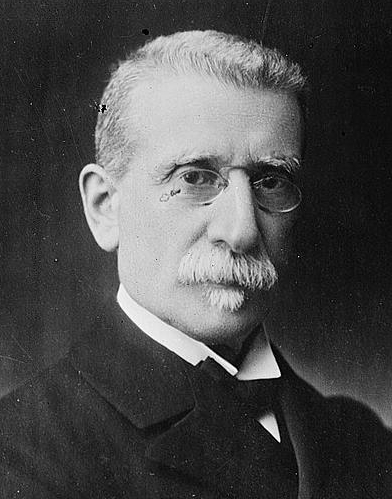
- Born: 15 January 1847; Rome, Papal States
- Died: 22 October 1935 (aged 88); Rome, Kingdom of Italy
- Citizenship: Italy
- Education: Royal University of Rome
- Known for: Marchiafava–Bignami disease Marchiafava's postpneumonic triad Strübing-Marchiafava-Micheli syndrome Etiology of malaria Genus name Plasmodium
- Children: John and Ricardo
- Awards: Manson Medal (1926)
- Scientific career
- Fields: Medicine; Pathology; Neurology
- Workplaces: Royal University of Rome
- Author abbrev. (zoology): Marchiafava

Senator Ettore Marchiafava

Senato del Regno
- In office 24 November 1913 – 4 July 1914
- President: Giuseppe Manfredi
- Constituency: Rome

Ettore Marchiafava (3 January 1847 – 22 October 1935) was an Italian physician, pathologist and neurologist. He spent most of his career as professor of medicine at the University of Rome (now Sapienza Università di Roma). His works on malaria laid down the foundation for modern malariology. He and Angelo Celli were the first to elucidate living malarial parasites in human blood, and able to distinguish the protozoan parasites responsible for tertian and benign malaria. In 1885 they gave the formal scientific name Plasmodium for these parasites. They also discovered meningococcus as the causative agent of cerebral and spinal meningitis. Marchiafava was the first to describe syphilitic cerebral arteritis and degeneration of brain in an alcoholic patient, which is now eponymously named Marchiafava's disease. He gave a complete description of a genetic disease of blood now known Paroxysmal nocturnal hemoglobinuria or sometimes Strübing-Marchiafava-Micheli syndrome, in honour of the pioneer scientists. He was personal physician to three successive popes and also to House of Savoy. In 1913 he was elected to Senate of the Kingdom of Italy. He founded the first Italian anti-tuberculosis sanatorium at Rome. He was elected member of the Accademia dei Lincei, becoming its vice-president in 1933.

== Biography ==
Ettore Marchiafava born in Rome to Francesco Marchiafava and Marianna Vercelli. He graduated in medicine and surgery from the University of Rome (Sapienza Università di Roma) in 1869. He earned doctorate degree in 1872. He won gold medal from his medical course. He immediately worked as assistant to Tommasi Crudeli at pathology department of the University of Rome. He was appointed associate professor in 1881, and became full Professor from 19 April 1885. In 1886, he succeeded Crudeli as chair of the department. In 1916 he succeeded Guido Baccelli as chair of medicine, and in 1917 he was given additional appointment of Professor of medicine. He retired on 30 July 1922 and continued as Professor Emeritus.

During his professional career Marchiava served in several important offices. He was Director of the Cabinet of Pathological Histology at the University of Rome in 1882, member of the Higher Council of Education during 1895–1899, extraordinary member of the Provincial Health Council of Rome, member of Provincial Health Council of Rome, Vice-chairman of the Central Committee of the Italian Red Cross, Corresponding member of the Accademia dei Lincei in 1899, and national member of the Accademia dei Lincei in 1908. He was elected vice-president of the Accademia dei Lincei of Rome between 13 July to 27 November 1933. He served as personal physician to three popes, Leo XIII, Pius X and Benedict XV. He was also official physician to the Royal House of Savoy. In 1913 he was elected senator in the Senate of the Kingdom of Italy.

== Achievements ==
Marchiafava first developed his first research interest in pathology from Robert Koch, whom he met in Berlin during his doctoral course. He studied malaria intensively for eleven years, from 1880 to 1891. With Angelo Celli, in 1880, he confirmed a new protozoan (then called Oscillaria malariae) discovered by Alphonse Laveran, finding it in the blood of the many patients with malaria fever. They were the first to use proper staining (with methylene blue) to identify malarial parasite as distinct blue-coloured pigments in the blood cells. They showed that the parasites lived inside blood cell, and that they divide by simple splitting (fission). They were the first to recognize several the stages of development of the malarial parasite in human blood. They called the new microorganism Plasmodium in 1885. Their works helped to differentiate different types of malaria as a result of infection with different species of Plasmodium. With Amico Bignami he published a classic monograph On Summer-Autumnal Fevers in 1892, which was translated into English in 1894. This was a major foundation in modern malariology. They reported the direct evidence of mosquito theory that mosquitoes transmit malaria.

Marchiafava was the author of Sulle febbri malariche estivo-autunnali (1892) and La infezione malarica (1902). In 1884, with Angel Celli, he first observed Gram-negative diplococci in the cerebrospinal fluid of a fatal case of meningitis in 1884. This was the then-unnamed Neisseria meningitidis (meningococcus), the agent of bacterial meningitis, although this was not proven until 1887 when Anton Weichselbaum isolated the bacterium from six cases of meningitis and established the isolates as a distinct species. Marchiafava described for the first time the histopathology of syphilitic cerebral arteritis. In 1897, he observed a callused body in the brain of an alcoholic patient, and, in 1903, with Amico Bignami, published a complete description of the insanity of alcoholics, one form of which is today known as Marchiafava–Bignami disease. (The disease is now known in nonalcoholic but diabetic patients.) He was the first one to prove the importance of sclerosis of the coronary arteries in the pathogenesis of myocardial infarction. He also worked on nephropathy and described streptococcal glomerulonephritis. In 1931, he described Paroxysmal nocturnal hemoglobinuria in depth, and also a rare form of this disease Strübing-Marchiafava-Micheli Syndrome.

In 1925, Marchiafava organised the first international conference on malaria.

== Awards and honours ==
- Knight of the Order of the Crown of Italy (5 June 1881)
- Officer of the Order of the Crown of Italy (11 January 1885)
- Knight of the Order of SS. Maurice and Lazarus (20 January 1889)
- Officer of the Order of SS. Maurice and Lazarus (27 January 1890)
- Commander of the Order of the Crown of Italy (30 December 1894)
- Elected honorary fellow of the Royal Society of Medicine (1905)
- Grand Officer of the Order of the Crown of Italy (29 December 1907)
- Knight of the Order of Civil Savoy (1916)
- Commander of the Order of SS. Maurice and Lazarus (19 October 1923)
- Grand Cordon of the Order of the Crown of Italy (13 November 1924)
- Grand Officer of the Order of SS. Maurice and Lazarus (2 July 1926)
- Manson Medal (1926)

== Additional source ==
- Conci, C (1975). "Repertorio delle biografie e bibliografie degli scrittori e cultori italiani di entomologia". Mem. Soc. Ent. Ital. 48: 817–1069.
- Conci, C.; Poggi, R. (1996). "Iconography of Italian Entomologists, with essential biographical data". Mem. Soc. Ent. Ital. 75: 159–382, 418.
- Hackett, L. W. (1936). "[Marchiafava, E.]". J. Parasitol. 22: 219–220.
- Missiroli, A (1936). "[Marchiafava, E.]". Riv. Malariol. 15: 185–189.
