= Giuseppe Bastianelli =

Italian physician and zoologist (1862–1959)

Giuseppe Bastianelli (25 October 1862 – 30 March 1959) was an Italian physician and zoologist who worked on malaria and was the personal physician of Pope Benedict XV.

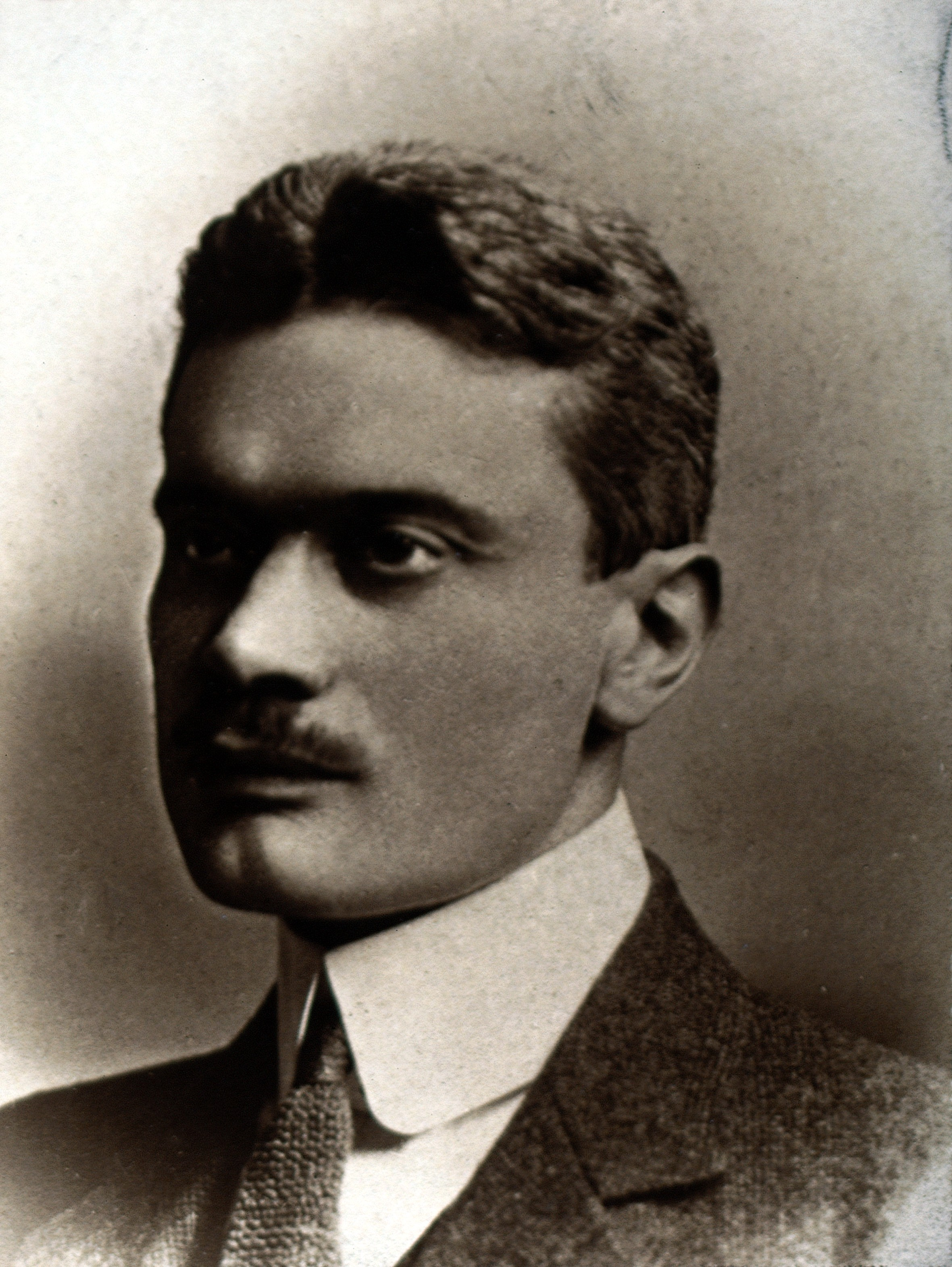

Born in Rome, Bastianelli was initially interested in chemistry, physiology and neurology; subsequently he became interested in the study of malaria. He worked in the "Santo Spirito a Roma" hospital with Ettore Marchiafava, Angelo Celli and Amico Bignami, studying the clinical aspects of this disease. He then moved to the Sapienza University of Rome where he directed l'Istituto di Malariologia, the Institute of Malarial studies dedicated to Ettore Marchiafava, where he worked until he died. The institute was a major contributor to the campaign that led to the complete eradication of malaria in Italy.

== Biography ==
=== Early life ===
Giuseppe Bastianelli was born in Rome on October 25, 1862, in a family originally from Umbria, Italy, from Giulio Bastianelli and Teresa Zanca. Being the son of Giulio Bastianelli, chief physician in the Ospedale di Santo Spirito in Sassia in Rome and municipal councilor, as well as the nephew of a surgeon operating in Trevi in Umbria, Giuseppe Bastianelli grew up in a medical-influenced environment, along with his younger brother Raffaele Bastianelli. This oriented his younger self towards the development of medical interests, which he will then explore and deepen during his university years. His elder brother Raffaele Bastianelli (Rome, 26 December 1863 – Rome, 1 September 1961) undertook a successful career as well, being a surgeon specialized in oncology as well as a political figure due to his nomination of senator.

=== Studies and career ===
Giuseppe Bastianelli attended the Medicine faculty at the University of Rome, and he explored with diligence the subjects of physics and chemistry but especially of physiology, soon becoming a student of the physiologist Jacob Moleschott, with whom he started interesting investigations on intestinal juices, which were unfortunately interrupted then for lack of means. He also studied chemistry with Stanislao Cannizzaro.

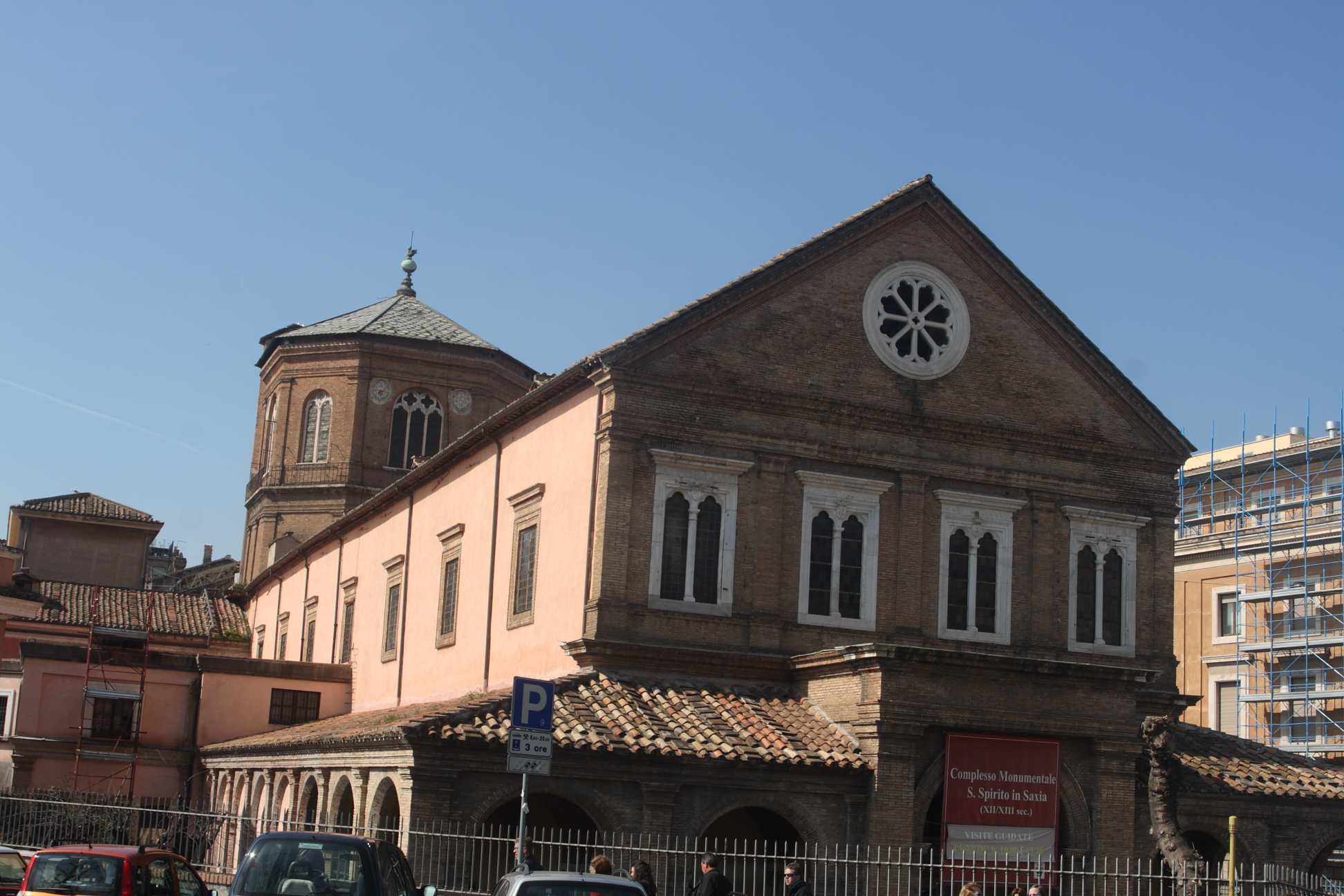
Ospedale Santo Spirito in Sassia

He obtained a medical degree in 1885 and thus, a medical culture of the highest order was formed, which later made him gain recognition even outside of Italy (primarily in America, England and Germany). In 1891, at twenty-nine years old, Bastianelli earned the title of primary doctor in the Ospedale di Santo Spirito in Sassia Rome, where he worked alongside the physicians Angelo Celli, Ettore Marchiafava and Amico Bignami, especially in the field of the physiopathology of malaria. He became professor at Sapienza University of Rome and dirigent of The Institute of Malariology "E. Marchiafava", and he was the only member of the Roman School of Malariology to take part in the campaign of eradication of malaria, in support of the work of Alberto Coluzzi.

=== Political and later life ===
"Con Bastianelli possiamo ben dire che scompare dalla scuola medica romana un grande scienziato e dalla società un uomo probo ed onesto che meritatamente fu chiamato ad occupare un seggio nel Senato italiano"

Giuseppe Bastianelli was then awarded the nomination of senator in 1939, due to his admirable scientific accomplishments, and he was able to get the recognition he deserved for his excellence in both the medical and social field. He died in Rome on March 30, 1959, at the age of ninety-six.

== Research ==
=== Work on Anopheles ===
Bastianelli dedicated himself to a long series of researches on the various clinical forms of malaria, a life-threatening disease that represented one of the most serious issues of the social medicine of his time and that claimed many human victims in some areas close to Rome, where himself lived. Between 1880 and 1885, he and his colleagues Angelo Celli, Ettore Marchiafava, Amico Bignami, Camillo Golgi and Giovanni Battista Grassi contributed to the resolution of this big social and sanitary issue by associating a different species of Plasmodium to each type of malaric fever: the most severe form of malaria, called terzana maligna was attributed to Plasmodium falciparum, while a milder form of the disease called terzana benigna was associated to Plasmodium vivax.

The research that, among all, gave Bastianelli his fame was that on the cycle of the parasite in the anopheles. Bastianelli and Bignami worked on anopheles that were caught and sent to them by Grassi and fed with the blood of malarici, allowing them to finally obtain the development of the parasite: they could therefore describe all the phases of the sporogonic cycle of Plasmodium Vivax from the Cocists stage of 42 hours until the formation and liberation of the sporozoites, and they presented their report on the subject to the Accademia dei Lincei on December the 4th 1898.

Between September 1898 and February 1899, Giovanni Battista Grassi, entomologist at the Roman School of Malariology, concluded the work on the identification of malaria vectors, and together with Bastianelli and Bignami he clarified the biological pattern of plasmodia from Anopheles mosquito to man in studies conducted in Ospedale di Santo Spirito in Sassia in Rome using Anopheles claviger. Once the biological pattern of malaria transmission had been identified, all the possible breaking points in the transmission chain were considered to achieve the target of stopping it.

Bastianelli was also among the firsts attempting to conduct modern clinical trials in Italy on antimalarial agents, in respect of which methodology used is particularly relevant. Main features of his trials are the attention to both historical controls and concurrent controls, the accurate description of side effects, the interest in the short-term findings to assess whether the action of the preventive or therapeutic interventions persisted over time.

=== Work on Leukocytes ===
Between 1891 and 1892, Bastianelli dedicated himself to the study of the function of leukocytes in the blood, concluding that circulating mononucleated cells behave in the same way as the fixed elements of the splenic and medullary pulp with which they share the morphological significance: an observation that anticipated the concept of the reticuloendothelial system, which was established only some years later. In addition, he illustrated the pathogenesis of malaria hemoglobinuria and the passage of parasites from mother to fetus.

== Teaching ==
=== New Teaching Method ===
In 1926, Bastianelli was entrusted with the teaching of medical semeiotics at the University of Rome, occupying the first chair of semiotics in Italy, which he left in 1935 for age limits. His vast culture allowed him to form a large group of pupils, and he established a new educational course which was mainly practical and consisted in putting small groups of students in contact with the patient and instructing them with the help of his collaborators. The method became established and was followed by numerous doctors; practical teaching was supplemented by a few theoretical lessons, real essays on anatomy, physiology, physics and chemistry applied to sick people. He endowed and enriched the institute, even only for generous personal donations, of the best scientific apparatus.

Original copy of book on the Institute of Malariology

=== Institute of Malariology ===
The Institute Ettore Marchiafava was born as an evolution of the Superior School of Malariology, established in Rome in 1925 as an output of the international Congress of malaria. The school was established with the aim of Promoting studies and training on all the medical problems related to malaria and on the reclamation and on the cultivation of marshy areas.

Initially, the institute was directed by Professor Vittorio Ascoli and had its headquarters at the Medical Center of the Royal University of Rome. Bastianelli succeeded to Ascoli, being appointed Director on March 25, 1931. With the new direction, the school was relocated from the medical clinic to the IX pavilion of the Policlinico Umberto I. Six years on from its creation, the School was transformed into the Institute of Malariology Ettore Marchiafava because more suitable toward research. The Institute had the aim of teaching malariology and studying malaria.

In the Institute there were courses of specialization for doctors from all over the world, initially promoted by the League of Nations, to create competent personnel to be sent to the different countries struggling with malaria. During these courses, Bastianelli organized trips and visits to the areas of Italy most plagued by malaria to illustrate the organization and defensive and prophylactic network against it and to raise awareness on chronic malaria. Over the years, he followed the development of studies on malaria.

Later, during the conflict of the Second World War, the Laboratory of Malariology continued its work of research, despite the imaginable difficulties of the moment. The activity, in fact, took place mainly in the laboratory and to a very limited extent in the field. Giuseppe Bastianelli was the only member of the Roman School of Malariology to take part in the campaign of eradication of malaria, supporting the work of Alberto Coluzzi.

== Main Publications ==
- On spring malarial infection, in collaboration with Amico Bignami, 1890.
- Observations on summer-autumn malarial forms, in collaboration with Amico Bignami, 1890.
- On the transmission of malaria parasites from mother to fetus, in collaboration with Amico Bignami, 1892.
- Studies on malarial infection; in collaboration with Amico Bignami, 1893–94.
- Sur la nature des parasites des fièvres estate-autoninales, in collaboration with Amico Bignami, 1895.
- Combined sclerosis of the spinal cord in pernicious anemias, 1895–96.
- Cultivation of man’s malarial half-moons in the Anopheles Claviger, in collaboration with Amico Bignami and Giovanni Battista Grassi, 1898.
- On the development of tertian parasites in the Anopheles Claviger, in collaboration with Amico Bignami, 1898–1899.
- Resoconto degli studi fatti sulla malaria durante il mese di gennaio, in collaboration with Amico Bignami and Giovanni Battista Grassi, 1899.
- Weitere Untersuchungen úber den Lebenslauf der menschlichen Malariaparasiten in Körper des Moskito; in collaboration with Amico Bignami and Giovanni Battista Grassi, 1899.
- Untersuchungen die malaria, in collaboration with Amico Bignami and Giovanni Battista Grassi, 1900.
- Ueber die Structur der Malariaparasiten, insbesondere der Gameten der Parasiten des Aestivoautumnalfieber, in collaboration with Amico Bignami, 1900.
- Plasmodium Falciparum; in collaboration with Amico Bignami, 1900.
- Considerations on the treatment of malaria, 1933.
- On the treatment of malaria: Immunity and therapy, 1936.
- Malaria, in Lo Sperimentale, 1941.
- What must be done to prevent and treat malaria in Sanitary Forces, 1941.
- Exo-Erythrocytic forms of malaria parasites, 1948.

== Bibliography ==
- Bastianelli Giuseppe, su Treccani, Enciclopedie on line, Istituto dell'Enciclopedia Italiana.
- Bastianelli G., Canalis A., Mosna E., Prevention and Treatment of Malaria by synthetic drugs: Field Experiments, The James Lind Library, 1937/2010.
- Battaglia F., Campofiorito N., Deplano C., Malaria.
- Cardillo M., Bastianelli Giuseppe, 2017.
- Conci, C., Repertorio delle biografie e bibliografie degli scrittori e cultori italiani di entomologia. Memorie della Società Entomologica Italiana, 817–1069, 1969/1975.
- Conci, C. & Poggi, R., Iconography of Italian entomologists, with essential biographical data, 75 159–382, 418 figures, 1996.
- Caxalis, A., Lega G., Raffaele, G., [Bastianelli, G.] Rivista di Malariologia, Portrait, 1959.
- Cox, Francis EG, History of the Discovery of the Malaria Parasites and Their Vectors, Parasites & Vectors 3, 2010.
- Garattini, S., Italian controlled trials to assess prevention and treatment of malaria, 1900-1930s. JLL Bulletin: Commentaries on the history of treatment evaluation, 2018 .
- Howard, L. O., Bastianelli, G. "Smithson. Miscell. Coll", 84 468, 491, 580, 1930.
- Raffaele, G., Bastianelli, G. 20 223–228, 1959.
- Sebastiani, A., I Disturbi Del Ritmo Cardiaco: Prefazione Di Giuseppe Bastianelli, Biblioteca Nazionale Di Firenze, 1924.
- Senato, Scheda Senatore BASTIANELLI Giuseppe.
