= Bastianelli P.R.B. =

Bastianelli P.R.B
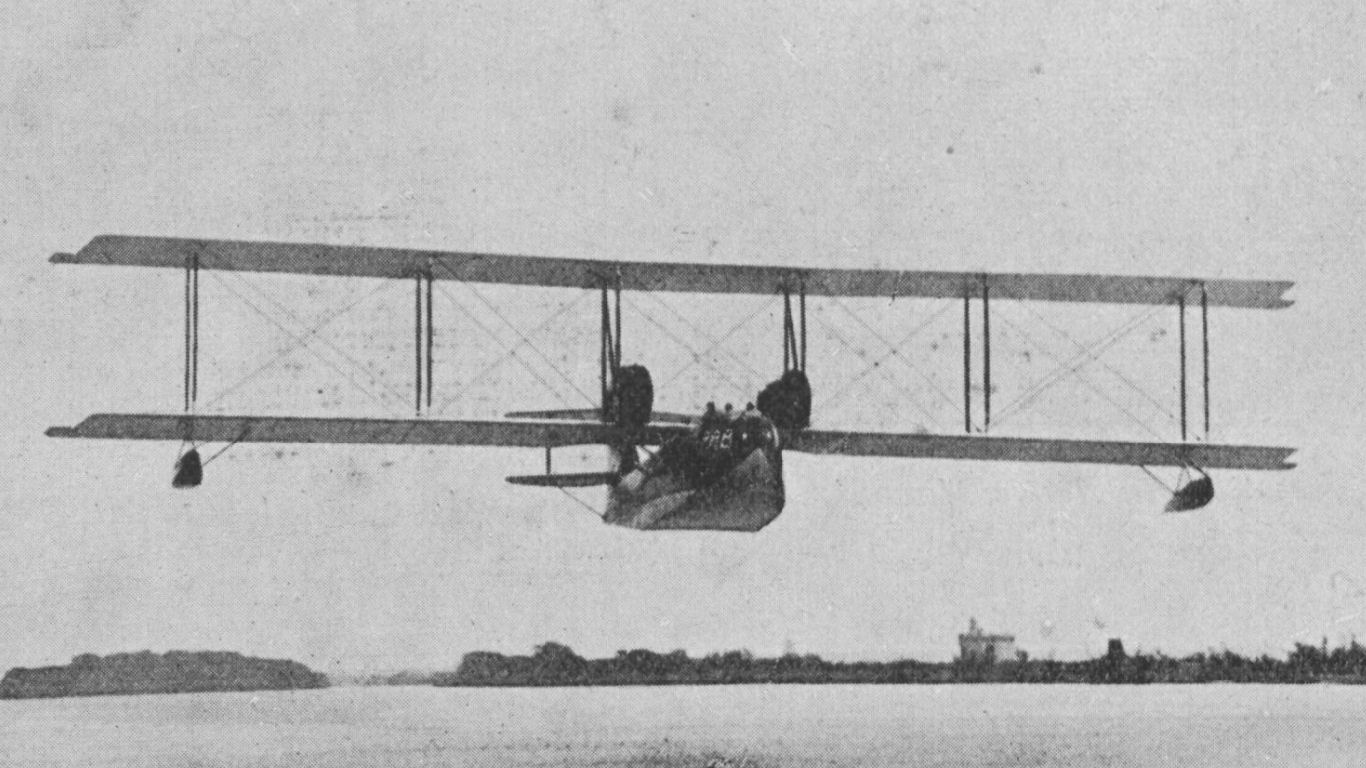

General information
- Type: Four-engined flying-boat
- National origin: Italy
- Manufacturer: Societá Industriale l'Aviazone
- Number built: 1

History
- First flight: 11 May 1921

The Bastianelli P.R.B was a 1920s Italian flying-boat, the first product of Societá Industriale l'Aviazone.

== Design and development ==
The Bastianelli P.R.B (named after the three Italians that formed the company Giovanni Pegga, Giuseppe Rossi and Filippo Bastianelli) was a large span two-bay biplane flying boat. It was powered by four 300 hp (224 kW) Fiat A.12bis inline piston engines mounted in tandem pairs on the lower wing. Built in Rome it was transported to Lido di Ostia for completion and testing and it first flew on 11 May 1921 piloted by Rossi. Although it flew well, only one was built and it did not enter production.

== Specifications ==
Data from Illustrated Encyclopedia of Aircraft

General characteristics

- Crew: 1
- Capacity: 3 passengers
- Length: 18.00 m (59 ft 1 in)
- Wingspan: 31.40 m (103 ft 0 in)
- Height: 6.60 m (21 ft 8 in)
- Wing area: 12.26 m^{2} (132.0 sq ft)
- Empty weight: 438 kg (966 lb)
- Max takeoff weight: 748 kg (1,649 lb)
- Powerplant: 4 × Fiat A.12bis inline piston engine, 220 kW (300 hp) each

Performance

- Maximum speed: 241 km/h (150 mph, 130 kn)
- Cruise speed: 217 km/h (135 mph, 117 kn)
- Range: 805 km (500 mi, 435 nmi)
- Service ceiling: 5,485 m (17,995 ft)

== See also ==
Related lists

- List of flying boats and floatplanes
