= Amico Bignami =

Italian physician and pathologist (1862–1929)

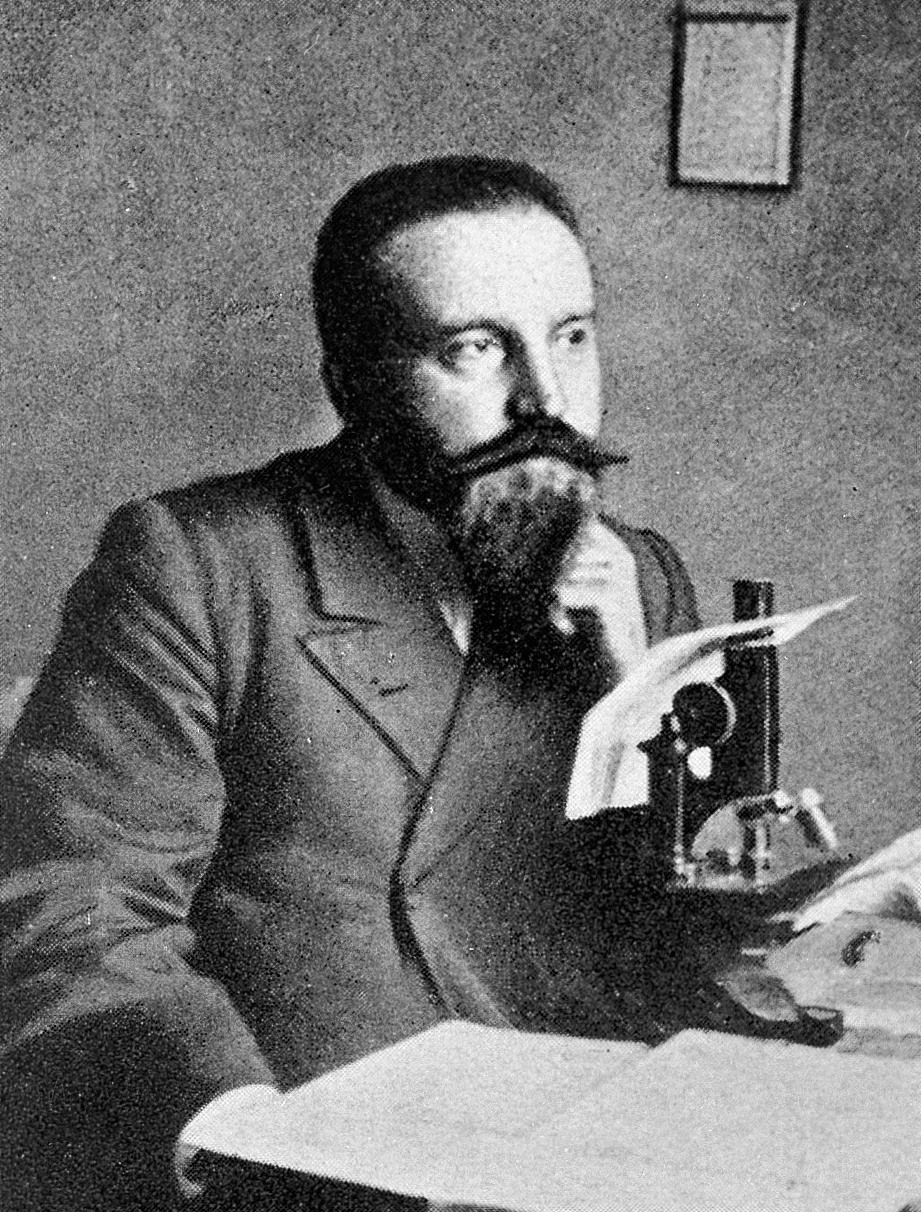
- Born: 15 April 1862; Bologna, Italy
- Died: 8 September 1929 (aged 67); Rome, Italy
- Citizenship: Italy
- Education: Sapienza University of Rome
- Known for: Marchiafava–Bignami disease Transmission of malaria
- Scientific career
- Fields: Medicine; Malariology
- Workplaces: Sapienza University of Rome; Ospedale riuniti di Roma

Amico Bignami (15 April 1862 – 8 September 1929) was an Italian physician, pathologist, malariologist and sceptic. He was professor of pathology at Sapienza University of Rome. His most important scientific contribution was in the discovery of transmission of human malarial parasite in the mosquito.

With researcher Ettore Marchiafava he described a neurological disease, which is now given the eponymous name Marchiafava–Bignami disease.

== Biography ==
Amico Bignami was born in Bologna to Eugenia and Francesco Mazzoni. He earned his medical degree from University of Rome (Sapienza University of Rome) in 1887. He was immediately appointed as assistant to Tommasi Crudelli in the Institute of General Pathology, where he worked until 1891. That year he joined the Institute of Pathological Anatomy under by Ettore Marchiafava. In 1890, he became extraordinary professor of pathology at the University of Rome and was promoted to full professor in 1906. In 1917, he became professor of medicine, a post he occupied until his retirement in 1921. In addition from 1896 he was practising assistant physician at the Ospedale riuniti di Roma.

He was interested particularly in the pathology of the brain. He discovered the clinical nature of alcoholism, now known as Marchiafava–Bignami disease. He also made pioneering work in isolation of Bacterium coli (now Escherichia coli) in humans. He also contributed to the study of leukemia. He died in Rome in 1929.

== Malariology ==
Bignami and his colleague Machiafava published a 169-page monograph On Summer-Autumnal Fevers in 1892, which was translated into English in 1894. They were the first to distinguish symptoms of Plasmodium falciparum, the causative agent of tertian malaria, from benign forms. They found that the malaria parasites were spherical in nature (rather than filamentous, as generally believed), mainly intraerythrocytic (rather than free living), that the liberation of spores at segmentation (schizont rupture) caused fever, and that there were different species of malaria parasites (each with its own different characteristics, notably fever periodicity). They observed that malignant malaria was caused only by the parasite species causing aestivo-autumnal malaria. With Giuseppe Bastianelli, he discovered that in malarial patients, it was the young (early staged) Plasmodium that caused fevers, but not the old crescent forms (gametocytes), discovered by Alphonse Laveran. Specifically they found that the crescent forms appeared in the second week of fever.

Bignami theorised in 1896 that the mosquito can be the vector of the disease. To show this, he captured mosquitoes in areas with high incidence of malaria and had them bite healthy people. But, like Sir Ronald Ross, a British Army surgeon working in India on the same mission (following Patrick Manson's mosquito-malaria theory), he failed to find direct evidence. In August 1897, Ross discovered malarial parasites inside the mosquito, which indicated that the mosquito was the carrier. In 1898, Bignami, Giovanni Battista Grassi, Antonio Dionisi and Giuseppe Bastianelli's experiments succeeded. Bignami did not hesitate to be bitten himself and to contract the disease. The three scientists presented on November 28, 1898, the results of their observations to the Accademia dei Lincei.

== Legacy and honors ==
- In 1923 Bignami was elected a member of the Accademia dei Lincei.
- In 1926 the academy awarded him the Santoro prize for his studies on malaria.

== Works ==
Bignami's major works include Ricerche sull’anatomia patologica delle perniciose (1890), Sulle febbre malariche estivo-automnali(1892) or On Summer-Autumnal Fevers (1894), La malaria e le zanzare (1899), La infezione malarica (1902) and with Grassi, Ciclo evolutivo della semilune nell' Anopheles claviger (1899).

== Additional sources ==
- Conci, C. 1975. Repertorio delle biografie e bibliografie degli scrittori e cultori italiani di entomologia. Mem. Soc. Ent. Ital. 48 1969(4) 817–1069.
- Conci, C. & Poggi, R. 1996. "Iconography of Italian Entomologists, with essential biographical data." Mem. Soc. Ent. Ital. 75 159–382, 418 Fig.
- Biography, L'Encicopedia Italiana
