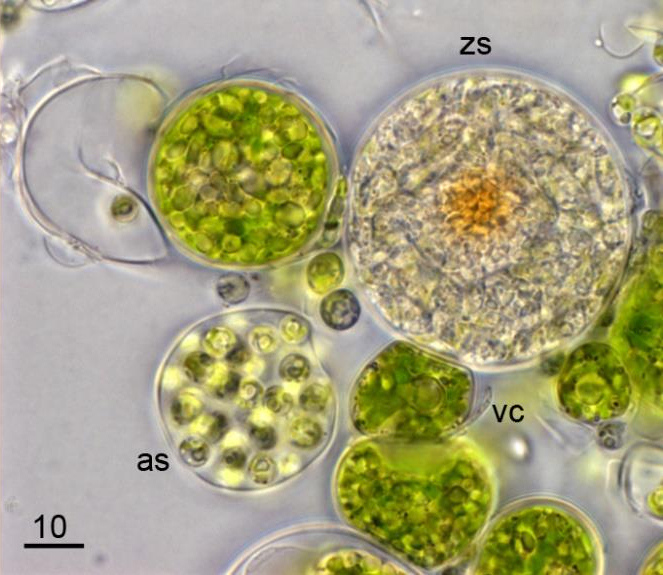

Scientific classification
- Domain: Eukaryota
- Clade: Sar
- Clade: Alveolata
- Phylum: Chromerida
- Class: Colpodellophyceae
- Order: Colpodellida
- Family: Vitrellaceae
- Genus: Vitrella
- Species: V. brassicaformis

Binomial name
- Vitrella brassicaformis Oborník et al., 2012

= Vitrella =

Species of single-celled organism

Vitrella brassicaformis (CCMP3155) is a unicellular alga belonging to the eukaryotic supergroup Alveolata. V. brassicaformis and its closest known relative, Chromera velia, are the only two currently described members of the phylum Chromerida, which in turn constitutes part of the taxonomically unranked group Colpodellida. Chromerida is phylogenetically closely related to the phylum Apicomplexa, which includes Plasmodium, the agent of malaria. Notably, both V. brassicaformis and C. velia are photosynthetic, each containing a complex secondary plastid. This characteristic defined the discovery of these so-called 'chromerids,' as their photosynthetic capacity positioned them to shed light upon the evolution of Apicomplexa's non-photosynthetic parasitism. Both genera lack chlorophyll b or c; these absences link the two taxonomically, as algae bearing only chlorophyll a are rare amid the biodiversity of life. Despite their similarities, V. brassicaformis differs significantly from C. velia in morphology, lifecycle, and accessory photosynthetic pigmentation. V. brassicaformis has a green color, with a complex lifecycle involving multiple pathways and a range of sizes and morphologies, while Chromera has a brown color and cycles through a simpler process from generation to generation. The color differences are due to differences in accessory pigments.

== Isolation and identification ==
Extant cultures of V. brassicaformis were isolated from the coral Leptastrea purpurea in the Great Barrier Reef. These are available from the NCMA culture collection in Maine USA (cultures 3156, 3157, 3158) and are also backed up in other collections, such as NQAIF (Australia), and CCAP (UK). In 2004, the strains deposited to Culture Collection of Marine Phytoplankton (now Bigelow NCMA) by R. Moore were manually "re-isolated" (repurified) by CCMP staff. Staff worked under the assumption that the flagellate (motile) stage could be separated permanently from the benthic spherical stages, which is not so, as these are stages of a single lifecycle. The fact that this unusual peer-review process could have happened in the history of the description of the species is an example of the very unusual lifecycle/morphology combination of this organism compared to other photosynthetic eukaryotes that many culture collections were accustomed to handling. However, it is not an unusual lifecycle for dinoflagellates, which are photosynthetic relatives of V. brassicaformis.

Besides its varied somatic lifecycle, V. brassicaformis' putative gametogenesis and recombining stages have been well documented.

== Lifestyle ==
The term "mixotrophy" defines this lifestyle which combines phototrophy (light as energy source) and heterotrophy (predation as energy source). Mixotrophic dinoflagellates are very common in the food web, and "Vitrella"-like organisms may have been the ancestors of such, raising the possibility that further families of Chromerida may eventually be found in the environment.

== Description ==
Vitrella brassicaformis was described in 2011 by Obornik et al., from type material RM11 (CCMP3155) originally isolated from host Pocillopora damicornis. Major differences between V. brassicaformis and C. velia were noted by the authors, leading to their classification into two distinct families, Vitrellaceae and Chromeraceae, respectively. The plastid genome is a highly compact 85 kb-long circle.

== Evolution and taxonomy ==
Just as for its sister family Chromeraceae, the family Vitrellaceae is a bridge between alternate views of protist evolution: the botanical view versus the zoological view. These views need not be opposed. Apicomplexans (all non-photosynthetic) are generally described using the zoological code, while protistan (often unicellular) algae have often been described using the botanical code. Protistologists have always been free to use whichever code they choose, and these two organisms (V. brassicaformis and C. velia) are prime examples of the need for this freedom. They possess a flagellate stage and a benthic stage.

Researcher Thomas Cavalier-Smith investigating the origins of apicomplexans and dinozoans, suggested a joint category Myzozoa encompassing both of these superphyla, plus related groups the colpodellids and perkinsids. By morphology and lifestyle, like feeding through myzocytosis,V. brassicaformis more closely resembles an ancestral Myzozoan than C. velia does. These two lifestyles, autotrophy and heterotrophy, found in one organism (V. brassicaformis) represent the store of potential that was able to lead to the Myzozoan radiation.

== Ecology ==
Vitrella brassicaformis was originally isolated from the Scleractinian coral Leptastrea purpurea (tropical) using a variation of a method intended to isolate Symbiodiniaceae (algal symbionts of corals). Vitrellaceae occur globally in tropical and warm subtropical marine environments. They are associated not only with coral reef ecosystems, but also thrombolites, stromatolites and other calcifying marine environments.
