= Chromera =

Scientific classification
- Domain: Eukaryota
- Clade: Sar
- Clade: Alveolata
- Division: Chromerida
- Class: Colpodellophyceae
- Order: Colpodellida
- Family: Chromeraceae; Oborník & J.Lukeš 2011
- Genus: Chromera; Moore et al., 2008
- Species: C. velia

Binomial name
- Chromera velia Moore et al., 2008

Species of single-celled organism

Chromera velia is a unicellular photosynthetic chromerid in the superphylum Alveolata. It is of interest in the study of apicomplexan parasites, specifically their evolution and accordingly, their unique vulnerabilities to drugs.

C. velia uses metabolites (reduced carbon) from its chloroplast as its primary energy source. The same is true of another chromerid Vitrella brassicaformis. Together these are phylogenetically the closest known autotrophic organisms to apicomplexans, a group of aleovates that carry a non-photosynthetic plastid called the apicoplast. (Note: "Apicoplast" is a specialised word, derived from the word "plastid". Initially the word plastid was more suitable than "chloroplast" when describing organelles of apparent algal descent in any protist, but that lack any chlorophyll or light absorbing pigment. Those found in apicomplexan parasites are a prominent example. The majority of members of the apicomplexan lineage still contain a genome in the plastid, indicating the organelle of the lineage's ancestors was once photosynthetic, but these plastids have no light absorbing pigments or light reaction machinery.) The apicomplexans include many parasites important to human and animal health such as the malaria pathogen Plasmodium.

C. velia can be cultured in a lab like other algae. As relatives of the apicomplexans (both are aleovates), chromids offer a glance into how the apicomplexans (and other aleovates groups in general such as the dinoflagellates) have evolved. The Aleovata are known for having many unique biochemical and physiological features that surprise scientists who are more used to working with more familiar eukaryotes. By studying C. velia, the whole group can be better understood by using this chromerid as a reference point.

== Description ==
After the naming of the organism and description of the immotile form, several papers have since documented the vegetative motile form which excysts in a set of eight siblings from the progenitor cell.

Chromera has a structure resembling an apical complex, including a "pseudoconoid" (named for its resemblance to apicomplexan conoid) long sacculate micronemes. As of 2026, there is no confirmation that these structures are directly homologous, however. Direct confirmation would at least require proof that the two systems have components that correspond to each other, which was not possible until the development of a transfection technique in 2026.

=== Phylogenetic position ===
Chromera appears as a sister group of the Coccidia (which includes the Apicomplexa) in three an 2008 analysis of nuclear ribosomal DNA and plastid DNA. Further testing have continued to support this positioning. In addition, the relationship of apicomplexans, dinoflagellates, and Chromera from nuclear and plastid phylogenies agree with each other, indicating that the two had been inherited together vertically since the times of their last common ancestor.

- Alveolata
  - - Myzozoa
      - - - Apicomplexa
          - Chromids, including Chomera
        - Squirmida
      - - Perkinsozoa
        - Dinoflagellata
  - "Colponemida"
  - Ciliophora

=== Culture availability ===
Live C. velia is available to purchase from the NCMA culture collection in Maine USA, and is backed up in other culture collections such as CCAP (UK), and SCCAP (Scandinavia).

Preserved material is deposited in the Australian Museum, Sydney, as holotype/hapantotype Z.6967, being a preserved culture embedded in PolyBed 812, and is separately deposited also in absolute ethanol.

== Organelle biology ==
C. velia has chloroplasts (a type of plastid) and mitochondria, and as mentioned above, a structure that resembles the apical complex. Compared to dinoflagellates, C. velia shares many more simplifications in the plastid and mitochrondria with the apicomplexans, as expected for its phylogenetic position (above).

=== Plastid ===
The photosynthetic plastid of Chromera velia has 4 surrounding membranes and contains chlorophyll a, while chlorophyll c is missing. Photosynthesis has been examined in C. velia, and its photosynthetic carbon assimilation was shown to be very efficient, in the sense of adaptability to a wide range of light regimes, from high light to low light. Thus like other algae that contain only chlorophyll a (such as Nannochloropsis, a stramenopile), the lack of chlorophyll c does not appear to debilitate chromerids in any way. Accessory pigments in C. velia include isofucoxanthin.

Unlike other eukaryotic algae which use only UGG codons to encode the amino acid tryptophan in plastid genomes, the plastid genome of C. velia contains the codon UGA at several positions that encode tryptophan in the psbA gene and other genes. The UGA-Trp codon is characteristic of apicoplasts and the mitochondria of various organisms, but until the discovery of C. velia, was unprecedented in any photosynthetic plastid. Similarly, a bias towards poly-U tails is found specifically on the subset of apicoplast-encoded genes that are involved in photosynthesis in C. velia. Discovery of these two genetic features, the UGA-Trp, and the poly-U tailed photosynthesis genes, indicates that C. velia provides an appropriate model to study the evolution of the apicoplast. Another characteristic feature of C. velia is that its plastid genome is linear-mapping.

Another unusual feature of the Chromera plastid lies the photosystem I protein A1, psaA, which unlike in other plastids have a circularly permuted, split setup. The polycistronic gene is transcribed into separate mRNAs, separately translated, then the two peptides assemble together into a functional protein complex that acts like the regular psaA.

The plastid genome of C. velia is unusual in that there is evidence it may be linear and contains split genes for key photosystem genes. The linear state of the C. velia plastid genome is a reminder that C. velia is not an ancestral organism, but is a derived form, which evolved from an ancestral photosynthetic alveolate that presumably had a circular plastid genome, just as the other known chromerid Vitrella brassicaformis does.

=== Mitochondrion ===
The C. velia mitochondrial apparatus differs significantly from that of the other chromerid Vitrella brassicaformis. The respiratory complexes I and III of C. velia are missing, and that the function of complex III has been taken over by a lactate:cytochrome c oxidoreductase (D-LDH). In contrast, Vitrella and the apicomplexans both retain a canonical complex III. A D-LDH is also found in Vitrella.

The typical Myzozoan (refer to phylogeny above) mitochondrial genome has cox1, cox3, cob, and truncated but apparently functional pieces of rRNA, all on several pieces of linear DNA – most apicomplexan, all dinoflagellates, and Vitrella all conform to this pattern [save for a cox3:cob fusion in Vitrella]. Chromera mtDNA however only has cox3:cox1 fusion, cox1, and rRNAs, with cob, part of complex III, lost.

The nuclear-encoded components of complex III are also missing in Chromera. Still, this mitochondrioon, like the one in Vitrella, has two nuclear-encoded components that are not found in the apicomplexans: L-galactono-1,4-lactone dehydrogenase (G14LDH) and the aforementioned D-LDH.

=== Chromerosome ===
An unexpected finding in Chromera was a large (1 μm diameter) ever-present organelle bounded by two membranes, originally thought to be the mitochondrion. This organelle may not be a mitochondrion, but an extrusosome called the "chromerosome". The actual mitochondria, by contrast, were found to be small and multiple, just as for other alveolates.

=== Apical-like complex ===
As mentioned before, the apical-like complex is awaiting better characterization. Transcriptome data from 2015 suggests that the flagella apparatus of Chromera belongs to the same ancestral expression program as the Plasmodium apical complex.

== Genome ==
In July 2015 the full genome sequences of chromerids C. velia and V. brassicaformis were published along with transcriptomes, revealing the array of genes changed in the transition from a free living lifestyle to a parasitic lifestyle of apicomplexans. Analyses have been provided for metabolic capability, endomembrane trafficking systems, cytoskeleton genes, extracellular proteins (which are key to host interaction in apicomplexans), and some notable gene families such as apiAP2.

== Ecology ==
Chromera velia was first isolated by Dr Bob Moore (then at Carter Lab, University of Sydney) from the stony coral (Scleractinia, Cnidaria) Plesiastrea versipora (Faviidae) of Sydney Harbour, New South Wales, Australia (collectors Thomas Starke-Peterkovic and Les Edwards, December 2001). It was also cultured by Moore from the stony coral Leptastrea purpurea (Faviidae) of One Tree Island Great Barrier Reef, Queensland, Australia (collectors Karen Miller and Craig Mundy, November 2001). It is also found in the Caribbean and has been identified form sequence data in Curaçao.

A 2013 study has shown that Chromera is vertically transmitted from parent to offspring Montipora digitata via the coral's egg stage. It lives within the corals, a possible symbiosis. (Note: The definition of symbiosis only requires two species closely living together over a long term. This does not imply any benefit for one or the other: for example, both mutualism and parasitism are examples of symbiosis.) The Chromera cells could be cultured from the M. digitata eggs and were subsequently used to transiently colonise Acropora coral larvae. Chromera's known host range therefore includes the corals M. digitata, P. versipora (type host) and L. purpurea (alternate host), and extends through tropical and temperate waters.

Chromera grows faster in an in vitro mixotrophic culture, when sugars, sugar-alcohols, organic acids and amino acids are available. It is possible that it could obtain these nutrients from the host for its own benefit.

Despite being photosynthetic, Chromera does not appear to provide any benefit to its coral host. Using RNA-sequencing of the host Acropora digitifera, Chromera was found to strongly suppresses host immunity and modify both phagosome maturation and the apoptotic machinery. This kind of behavior is markedly different from the true mutualist Symbiodinium and looks more like what vertebrate pathogens do to their hosts (e.g. in tuberculosis infection). For now, the data indicates that Chromera may be a parasite, commensal, or accidental bystander, but certainly not a beneficial mutualist. One interpretation is that C. velia exists as a free-living phototroph when necessary or when environmental conditions are suitable, but can also infect coral larvae and live as an intracellular parasite.

Analysis of environmental metagenomic datasets has revealed that there are chromerid species related to C. velia and V. brassicaformis associated with corals, but yet to be described. These associations are globally distributed. Among these is the uncultured undescribed "apicomplexan-related lineage-V" which was inferred by the authors to be potentially photosynthetic, and appears to be a symbiosis specialist. Cultured chromerids by comparison can be hypothesized to move between the free-living and coral-associated states, as they are found in M. digitata eggs but are also associated with seaweed, judging from correlations in macroalgal metagenomic datasets. The range of life strategies and niches adopted by apicomplexan-related algae therefore resembles the spectrum of niches occupied by the coral symbiont Symbiodinium.

== In apicomplexan research ==
There is little doubt that apicomplexans evolved from a free-living organism with a functional chloroplast. Why and how they have lost the ability to be autotrophic and instead became parasites remains the great question.

There are several lines of attack into reconstructing this history. On the ecological side, the chromerids were often noted to be found in association with corals, so one hypothesis is that apicomplexans started their parasitic lifestyle by stealing from corals (some go further to claim that Chromera is a "photoparasite"). On one hand this appears supported by the discovery of a not-so-reduced apicoplast genome in corallicolid apicomplexans, but on the other hand a 2015 large-scale survey of apicomplexans and chromerids have revealed that algae (autotrophic) and predator (heterotrophic) lifestyles are not split as cleanly as previously thought on the tree of their evolution.

The discovery of Chromera velia and its unique plastid which is similar in origin to the apicoplasts, also provides an important link in the evolutionary history of the apicomplexans. Previous to the description of C. velia, much speculation surrounded the idea of a photosynthetic ancestral lineage for apicomplexan parasites. For a step by step history of the characterization of the apicomplexan apicoplast organelle, see for example the web review by Vargas Parada (2010). With that said, some Chromera plastid features such as the split psaA is not found in apicomplexans and is clearly a later derived characteristic: a reminder that there is no such thing as an living representation of any ancient ancestor, only its relatives that have retained different characteristics.

Another key innovation of the apicomplexans is the epynomous apical complex, used to invade host cells. Much research surrounds the flagellar apparatus of Chromera, Vitrella and apicomplexans, in relation to the morphological transition of this organelle during the origination of parasitism in apicomplexans.

=== Drug discovery ===
Besides being a sort of "missing link" in the study of evolution, chromerids such as Chromera are also potentially helpful in studies aimed at finding new antimalarial drugs or clarifying the function of existing antimalarial drugs. Many drugs that have been in clinical use for a long time affect functions in the apicoplast in Plasmodium cells. The essential biological function of the apicoplast is solely the production of isoprenoids and their derivatives, without which the parasites cannot live.

C. velia could serve as a convenient model target for the development of antimalarial drugs, given its many similarities. In the laboratory setting, working with apicomplexan parasites can be difficult, hazardous and expensive, because they must be infected into live host cells (in tissue culture) to remain viable. Chromera velia, is more easily maintained than apicomplexan parasites, yet is related to them, so may potentially provide a laboratory model for the understanding or development of antimalarial treatments. C. velia is able to live independently of its normal animal hosts and can be grown easily and cheaply in a laboratory setting.

Just as humans are subject to infections by the apicomplexans Plasmodium and Cryptosporidium, animals are also subject to infection by apicomplexans including Toxoplasma, Babesia, Neospora, and Eimeria. It is said anecdotally, that almost every animal on earth has one or more species of apicomplexan parasite that challenge it. The economic burden from apicomplexan parasites is estimated in the billions of dollars, on top of the human and animal costs of these organisms. An increased understanding of the evolutionary roles and functions of apicoplasts and apical complexes can impact on research about the apicomplexan parasites of livestock animals, making C. velia of interest in an agricultural context as well as in the medical and ecological fields.

A provisional patent on the use of Chromerida (Chromera and Vitrella) as subjects for screening and testing of anti-apicomplexan drugs was not lodged as a full patent, which leaves the way open for use of these organisms in commercial development of screening methods for useful compounds.

== Research community ==
The first Chromera conference and workshop was held at the Heron Island Research Station, Queensland, Australia from November 21–25, 2011. Highlights included diving and culturing. Presentations included the announcement of a formal description of the second isolated chromerid, Vitrella brassicaformis. Professors and students alike participated in the conference and workshop, and a broad range of topics was covered. It was agreed that further meetings would follow. The second conference was held in South Bohemia, Czech Republic, from June 22–25, 2014, arranged by the Oborník lab, via open email list.
