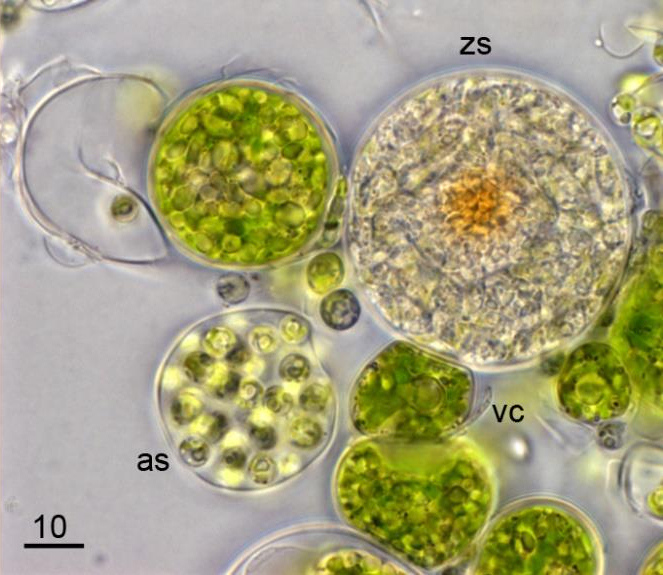
- Typical life cycle stages of Vitrella brassicaformis, a chromerid (vc: vegetative cell, zs: zoosporangium, as: autosporangium)

Scientific classification
- Domain: Eukaryota
- Supergroup: Alveolata
- Clade: ACS
- Division: Chromerida; Moore et al. 2008
- Class: Colpodellophyceae; Mylnikov et al. 2000
- Order: Colpodellida; Cavalier-Smith 1993

Type genus
- Colpodella Cienkowsky 1865

Subgroups
- Alphamonaceae; Chromeraceae; Colpodellaceae; Vitrellaceae

Synonyms
- Chromerida: Chromeridophyta R.B.Moore et al. 2008; Colpodellophyceae: Apicomonadea Cavalier-Smith 1993, emend. 2018

= Chrompodellid =

Chrompodellids

Phylum of alveolates

Chrompodellids are a phylum of single-celled protists belonging to the Alveolata supergroup. It comprises two different polyphyletic groups of flagellates: the colpodellids, phagotrophic predators, and the chromerids, photosynthetic algae that live as symbionts of corals. These groups were independently discovered and described, but molecular phylogenetic analyses demonstrated that they are intermingled in a clade that is the closest relative to Apicomplexa, and they became collectively known as chrompodellids. Due to the history of their research, they are variously known as Chromerida or Colpodellida (ICZN)/Colpodellales (ICN).

== Description and life cycle ==
Chrompodellids are a phylum of unicellular protists containing two functionally different groups: the photosynthetic "chromerids" and the predatory phagotrophic "colpodellids". Like other Alveolata, they present tubular mitochondrial cristae and highly flattened cortical alveoli with microtubules underneath. They exhibit a conoid-like structure similar to that of apicomplexans, with an apical complex, a micropore and a rostrum. They live as flagellates with two anisokont (i.e. differently sized) flagella that are heterodynamic (i.e. move in different patterns). Some species exhibit thin mastigonemes in their anterior flagellum, while others bear bulbs. Some species are capable of forming cysts.

=== Colpodellids ===
Colpodellids, represented by the genera Colpodella, Alphamonas, Voromonas and Chilovora, are free-living predatory phagotrophic flagellates. They live as biflagellated single cells, 5–20 μm in length, with an open conoid and rhoptries used to hunt. They present genetic sequences of non-photosynthetic plastids, evidence of their phototroph ancestry.

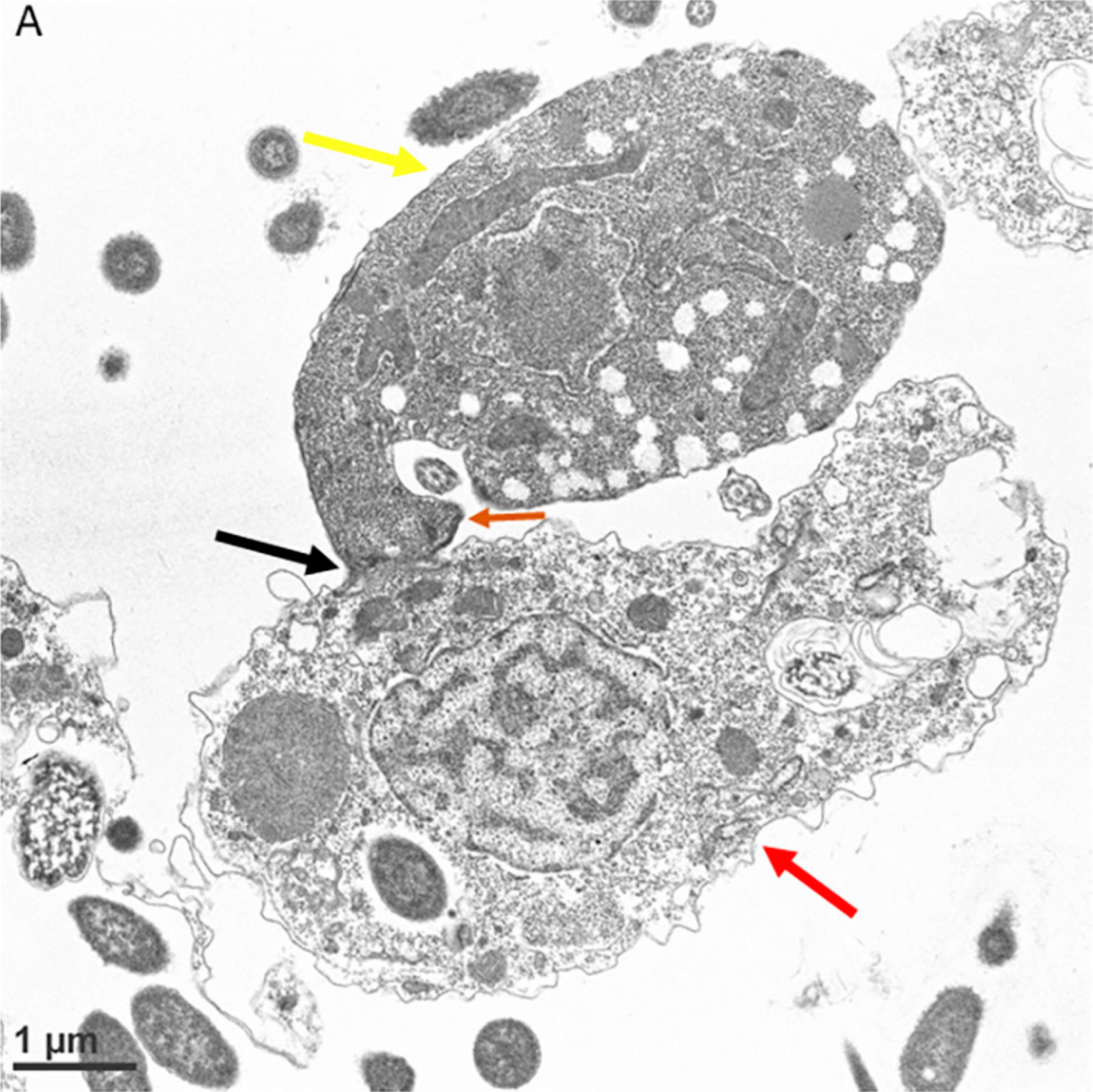
Transmission electron micrograph of Colpodella sp. (yellow arrow) attaching to Parabodo caudatus (red arrow). The point of attachment (black arrow) is posterior to the tip of the rostrum in the pseudoconoid (orange arrow).

Some species, considered ectoparasites, do not ingest prey cells, but rather fully or partially "suck" their contents, a process known as myzocytosis, common among alveolates. They feed on bacteria and other protozoa, such as bodonids, chrysomonads, bicosoecids and percolomonads. After feeding, they internalize their flagella, become cysts and divide into tetrads, similarly to the development of zoospores in Chromera. The cells conjugate after leaving the cyst, which could imply a sexual stage.

=== Chromerids ===
Chromerids, represented by the genera Chromera and Vitrella, are photosynthetic protists, and are thus considered algae. They exist in association with corals. For most of their life cycle, they live as round (coccoid) brownish (Chromera) or green (Vitrella) immobile vegetative cells called autospores, surrounded by a thick resistant cell wall. They contain one chloroplast in each cell, with chlorophyll a, violaxanthin, and β-carotene.

The two genera are markedly different from each other, both in phylogeny and life cycles. Chromera autospores are 5–7 μm in diameter. They asexually reproduce through binary division to develop autosporangia, which in turn harbor 2–4 autospores under an additional membrane. They also form zoosporangia, up to 15 μm in diameter, capable of generating 2–10 flagellated zoospores that strongly resemble colpodellids. This dispersal process is similar to the schizogony of apicomplexans. Sexual reproduction has not been observed. Under adverse environmental conditions, they form resistant cysts that remain viable for years. Similarly to apicomplexans, they undergo closed mitosis, without dissolving the nuclear envelope. In addition, Chromera produces high amounts of an exclusive type of isofucoxanthin.

Vitrella autospores, by contrast, start measuring 3 μm and grow up to 40 μm before transforming into sporangia that generate dozens of autospores or zoospores. There are two types of Vitrella zoospores: one is generated by budding from the mother cell and exhibits flagella outside the cytoplasm, the other develops axonemes and flagella within their cytoplasm and are ejected from the mother cell after maturing, though both types lack a pseudo-conoid. Some zoospores fuse, possibly representing a sexual stage in the life cycle. In addition, Vitrella produces vaucheriaxanthin.

== Evolution ==
Chrompodellids are the closest living relatives of the apicomplexan parasites, which evolved from a photosynthetic myzozoan ancestor, making chromerids the last remaining photosynthetic members of an otherwise parasitic clade within Alveolata. The apicomplexans, chrompodellids, perkinsids and dinoflagellates constitute the clade Myzozoa, characterized by the apical complex and plastids derived from an event of secondary endosymbiosis with a red alga. The photosynthetic ability of these plastids was eventually lost in apicomplexans, colpodellids, perkinsids and other groups that transitioned into a predatory or parasitic lifestyle. The following cladogram summarizes alveolate relationships and the internal relationships among most genera within the chrompodellid clade (chromerids marked with asterisks):

- Alveolata
  - - Myzozoa
      - - - Apicomplexa
          - - Chrompodellida
              - - Piridium
                - Vitrella*
              - - Alphamonas
                - - Chromera*
                  - - Voromonas
                    - Colpodella
        - Squirmida
      - - Perkinsozoa
        - Dinoflagellata
  - "Colponemida"
  - Ciliophora

== Systematics ==
=== Taxonomic history ===
In 1993, protozoologist Thomas Cavalier-Smith described the order Colpodellida (under the ICZN, later regularized as Colpodellales in accordance to the ICN) to contain what he considered one of the "most primitive flagellate apicomplexans", the genus Colpodella. This order was introduced in the class Apicomonadea along with the Perkinsida. Cavalier-Smith treats this class as a member of the phylum Apicomplexa, while "true" apicomplexans are united under the name Sporozoa. Although the inclusion of colpodellids within apicomplexans was not supported by other authors, phylogenetic studies demonstrated that they were sister clades.

The first chromerid alga, Chromera velia, was discovered and isolated from Australian corals in 2001. It was described in 2008 as the first member of a new phylum Chromerida, followed by Vitrella brassicaformis in 2012. They showed morphological resemblance to colpodellids and other myzozoans. In the following years, phylogenetic studies reported the evolutionary proximity between colpodellids and chromerid algae. This was supported by the discovery of retained vestigial plastids in some colpodellid species. In 2015 there was strong support for a clade containing the two groups, phylogenetically mixed with each other, which rendered both as polyphyletic. The clade was given the provisional name "chrompodellids", later referred to as Chrompodellida by posterior studies.

Between 2004 and 2017, Cavalier-Smith retained the classification scheme of Apicomonadea, from which he excluded Perkinsida, leaving only colpodellids and chromerids across multiple orders. In addition, several genera of flagellates were added on the basis of morphological data: Algovora, Microvorax and Dinomonas. Due to lacking molecular data, these genera have been excluded from later classifications. Two genera, Chilovora and Alphamonas, were eventually rejected in his classification, but later revisions by other authors maintain them as independent genera supported by molecular data.

The treatment of chrompodellids as a subgroup of Apicomplexa, under the name of Apicomonadea, was rejected by the International Society of Protistologists. In a 2019 revision of eukaryotic classification, protistologists emended the previous name Colpodellida to contain all chrompodellids, and treated it as a direct subgroup of Alveolata, independent from Apicomplexa. Later, phycologists advocated for this treatment as a separate phylum, and regularized it under the name of Chromerida or Chromeridophyta, composed of a single class Colpodellophyceae and a single order Colpodellales, in accordance to the nomenclatural rules of the ICN. However, other authors consider them a subgroup of the phylum Myzozoa, together with apicomplexans, perkinsozoans and dinoflagellates.

=== Classification ===
As of 2023, chrompodellids are divided into four higher clades and six genera:

- Clade Alphamonaceae Adl et al. 2019
  - Alphamonas A.G.Alexeieff
- Family Chromeraceae Oborník & Lukeš 2012
  - Chromera R.B.Moore et al. 2008
- Family Colpodellaceae A.G.B.Simpson & D.J.Patterson
  - Chilovora Cavalier-Smith 2004
  - Colpodella Cienkowsky 1865
  - Voromonas Cavalier-Smith 2004
- Family Vitrellaceae Oborník & Lukeš 2012
  - Vitrella Oborník & J.Lukeš 2012
- Incertae sedis: Piridium Patten 1936 (sister group to Vitrella but not formalized as a member of Vitrellaceae)
