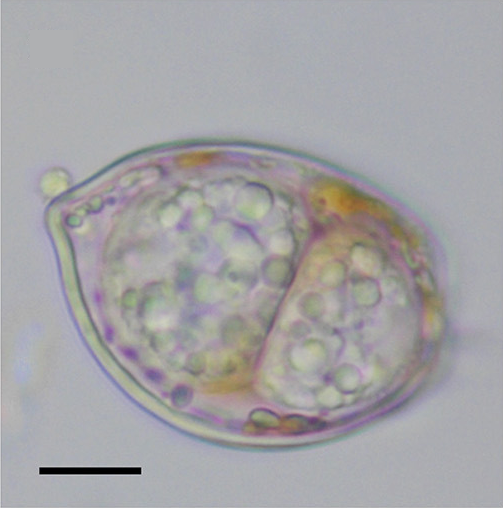
- Double infection of two late Dinovorax pyriformis trophonts in a Prorocentrum micans cell. Scale bar: 10 μm.

Scientific classification
- Domain: Eukaryota
- Clade: Sar
- Clade: Alveolata
- Phylum: Perkinsozoa
- Class: Perkinsea
- Family: Parviluciferaceae; Reñé & Alacid 2017

Type genus
- Parvilucifera Norén & Moestrup 1999

Genera
- Parvilucifera; Dinovorax; Snorkelia; Tuberlatum

Diversity
- 7 species

= Parviluciferaceae =

Family of microscopic endoparasites

Parviluciferaceae is a family of perkinsozoans, a group of endoparasitic protists present in aquatic environments.

== Biology and life cycle ==
Members of Parviluciferaceae behave as endoparasitoids of dinoflagellates, an important group of marine phytoplankton. Their life cycle consists of biflagellated zoospores with two unequally sized flagella, that swim toward dinoflagellate hosts, infect them and grow into sporangia that develop more zoospores. All genera share similar sporangium morphology and life cycle. Their main differences regard the morphology of zoospores. Dinovorax and Snorkelia zoospores infect the host cell through a germ tube, which is absent in Parvilucifera.

== Systematics ==
=== Etymology ===
The name of this family derives from the type genus, Parvilucifera. It derives from Latin parvus 'small' and lucidus 'shining', referring to the small refractile zoospores that characterize this genus.

=== Classification ===
There are currently four genera accepted in this family. The first to be described, Parvilucifera, initially was not assigned to any family, and instead belonged to the order Rastrimonadida, within the Perkinsea. A second genus was included within this order, Rastrimonas, for which no genetic sequences are available. In 2017 the family Parviluciferaceae was erected, with the inclusion of Parvilucifera and two additional genera: Dinovorax and Snorkelia. In December 2018 a fourth genus was described for this family, Tuberlatum. The most speciose genus is Parvilucifera, with four described species, while the remaining genera are monotypic, with one species each, adding to a total of 7 species in the family:

- Parvilucifera Norén & Moestrup 1999
  - P. corolla Reñé, Alacid, Figueroa, Rodríguez & Garcés 2016
  - P. infectans Norén & Moestrup 1999 (syn. P. sinerae Figueroa & Garcé 2008)
  - P. multicavata Jeon & Park 2020
  - P. rostrata Karpov & Guillou 2013
- Dinovorax Alacid & Reñé 2017
  - D. pyriformis Alacid & Reñé 2017
- Snorkelia Reñé & Alacid 2017
  - S. prorocentri (Leander & Hoppenrath 2007) Reñé & Alacid 2017 (basionym: Parvilucifera prorocentri Leander & Hoppenrath 2007)
- Tuberlatum Jeon & Park 2018
  - Tuberlatum coatsi Jeon & Park 2018
