= Colpodella =

Scientific classification
- Domain: Eukaryota
- Supergroup: Alveolata
- Division: Chromerida
- Class: Colpodellophyceae
- Order: Colpodellida
- Family: Colpodellaceae
- Genus: Colpodella; Cienkowski, 1865

Species
- See text

Synonyms
- Nephromonas Droop 1953 nomen dubium; Dingensia Patterson & Zoelffel 1991

Genus of single-celled organisms

Colpodella is a genus of alveolates comprising five species, and two further possible species: They share all the synapomorphies of apicomplexans, but are free-living, rather than parasitic. There have also been cases of pathogenic Colpodella infection in a few different species, including humans. Many members of this genus were previously assigned to a different genus - Spiromonas.

The type species is Colpodella pugnax Cienkowski 1865.

== Description ==
These are small (< 20 μm in diameter) flagellated protists. The life cycle of consists of two main stages: flagellated trophozoites and cysts, which are the reproductive stage in the life cycle.

Morphologically the trophozoites of Colpodella are similar to Perkinsus zoospores, although the two taxa are not specifically related. The motile stages of both genera have a pair of anterior orthogonal flagella, vesicular mitochondrial cristae, inner alveolar membranes and micropores. Both Colpodella and Perkinsus species have open sided truncated conoids (sometimes called pseudoconoids), rhoptries that occupy the length of the cell and smaller micronemes. Both the rhoptries and micronemes arise at the anterior portion of the cell. A three-layered pellicle lies beneath the plasma membrane and is otherwise composed of the alveolar membranes and widely separated microtubules that arise subapically. Some species have extrusive organelles (trichocysts).

Unlike Perkinsus, Colpodella are free-living and are voracious predators of other free-living protists and algae. Most species penetrate through the cell membrane and consume the prey's cytoplasm—this mode of feeding is known as myzocytosis. While feeding the predator attaches its anterior portion—the rostrum—to the prey. The anterior flagellar pit and the rostrum contains the pseudo-conoid. While it is characteristic of Apicomplexans to have a conoid feeding mechanism, known as the apical complex, Colpodella have a pseudo-conoid which, instead of a ring of microtubules, forms a C-ring of microtubules encircling the attachment zone. The cytoplasm of the prey is then drawn into a large posterior food vacuole. While feeding, multiple Colpodella have been observed to attach to the same prey individual and all of them consuming the cytoplasm of the same prey.

Following feeding cells lose their flagella, become spherical, encyst and divide (i.e. reproduce). The cysts are simple spheres. The food vacuole appears as a large central vacuole in the cyst; as division progresses the remnant vacuole material is reduced to a residual body. Typically Colpodella divides into four daughter cells (sometimes just two). This is in contrast to true Apicomplexa and Perkinsus, which typically produce many more daughter cells during reproduction. However, their closed mitosis where the nuclear envelope remains and the mitotic spindle is intranuclear is characteristic of Apicomplexa species. The daughter cells grow flagella, the cyst wall ruptures, and the cells swim away, leaving the residual body behind. A possible sexual process has been observed in at least two species.

== Taxonomy ==
This genus appears to be a sister clade to the Apicomplexa. Their life style may be representative of the free living ancestors of the Apicomplexa. One significant difference is that this genus, like the Perkinsea, have an open sided conoid (pseudoconoid) while the Apicomplexa which possess a conoid (the Conoidasida) have a closed conoid.

Another genus in this family is Acrocoelus.

Species currently within genus:

- Colpodella edax (Klebs 1892) Simpson & Patterson 1996
- Colpodella pseudoedax Mylnikov & Mylnikov 2007
- Colpodella pugnax Cienkowsky 1865 non Simpson & Patterson 1996
- Colpodella angusta (Dujardin 1841) Simpson & Patterson 1996 [Dingensia angusta (Dujardin 1841) Patterson & Zoelffel 1991]

Species transferred to other genera:

- Colpodella gonderi (Foissner & Foissner 1984) Simpson & Patterson 1996 as Microvorax gonderi (Foissner & Foissner 1984) Cavalier-Smith 2017
- Colpodella perforans (Hollande 1938) Patterson & Zölffel 1991 as Chilovora perforans (Hollande 1938) Cavalier-Smith & Chao 2004
- Colpodella pontica Mylnikov 2000 as Voromonas pontica (Mylnikov 2000) Cavalier-Smith & Chao 2004
- Colpodella pugnax Simpson & Patterson 1996 non Cienkowsky 1865 as Algovora pugnax (Simpson & Patterson 1996) Cavalier-Smith & Chao 2004
- Colpodella tetrahymenae Cavalier-Smith 2004 as Microvorax tetrahymenae (Cavalier-Smith & Chao 2004) Cavalier-Smith 2017
- Colpodella turpis Simpson & Patterson 1996 as Algovora turpis (Simpson & Patterson 1996) Cavalier-Smith & Chao 2004
- Colpodella unguis Patterson & Simpson 1996 as Colpovora unguis (Patterson & Simpson 1996) Cavalier-Smith 2017
- Colpodella vorax (Kent, 1880) Simpson & Patterson, 1996 as Dinomonas vorax Kent 1880

== Pathogenicity ==
These organisms are not normally considered to be human pathogens. However, there have been reports of pathogenic instances of Colpodella.

A report of an infection of the erythrocytes in a Chinese woman with a deficiency of natural killer cells has been reported.

A 55 year old woman in Northeast China was admitted to a hospital with the primary complaint of dizziness among other symptoms. Her white and red blood cells were tested in the normal range, but there was a higher proportion of granulocytes. Phylogenic analysis of the cause revealed likely Colpodella spp. to be the likely cause. Since the woman had an engorged tick removed from her 2 weeks prior, 474 host seeking Ixodes persulcatus from her area were tested and a few were positive for Colpodella spp. This led the researchers to believe that a tick was the likely vector of infection.
