= Perkinsus marinus =

Scientific classification
- Domain: Eukaryota
- Clade: Sar
- Clade: Alveolata
- Phylum: Perkinsozoa
- Class: Perkinsea
- Order: Perkinsida
- Family: Perkinsidae
- Genus: Perkinsus
- Species: P. marinus

Binomial name
- Perkinsus marinus (Mackin, Owen & Collier) Levine 1978

Synonyms
- Labyrinthomyxa marina 1966; Dermocystidium marinum J.G. Mackin et al., 1950

Species of single-celled organism

Perkinsus marinus is a species of alveolate belonging to the phylum Perkinsozoa. It is similar to a dinoflagellate. It is known as a prevalent pathogen of oysters, causing massive mortality in oyster populations. The disease it causes is known as dermo or perkinsosis, and is characterized by the degradation of oyster tissues. The genome of this species has been sequenced.

The species originally was named Dermocystidium marinum by Mackin, Owen and Collier in 1950.

== Taxonomy ==
Perkinsus marinus is a protozoan of the protist superphylum Alveolata, the alveolates. Its phylum, Perkinsozoa, is a relatively new taxon positioned between the dinoflagellates and the Apicomplexa, and is probably more closely related to the former. P. marinus is the type species of the genus Perkinsus, which was erected in 1978. When first identified in 1950, it was mistaken for a fungus.

== Description and life cycle ==
The protist is about 2 to 4 μm long. The zoospore has two flagella, which it uses to swim in its marine habitat. It is ingested by its mollusc host, which is often an oyster of the genus Crassostrea. It then becomes a trophozoite, which proliferates in the tissues of the host. P. marinus often infests the hemocytes, cells in the blood of the host, analogous to malaria in vertebrates. It is also often seen in the cells of the intestine, connective tissues, digestive glands, and gills. Inside the cell, the trophozoite produces a vacuole that displaces the cell nucleus. The infested cell is referred to as a signet ring cell, because it is spherical and filled with the rounded vacuole, and resembles a signet ring. The mature trophozoite undergoes binary fission and up to 16 immature trophozoites are produced. These stay in the host animal and infest its tissues, or are released into the water in the feces or from a dead host. Trophozoites in the water mature and release flagellated zoospores.

The most economically important host is the eastern oyster (Crassostrea virginica). The parasite is also common in C. corteziensis, and the species C. rhizophorae, C. gasar, and C. brasiliana are probably susceptible. Magallana gigas and M. ariakensis are experimentally susceptible, but may be more resistant. Certain clams such as Mya arenaria and Macoma balthica can be infected in experimental situations. In the laboratory, the sea snail Boonea impressa can be infected and then pass the parasite to an oyster host.

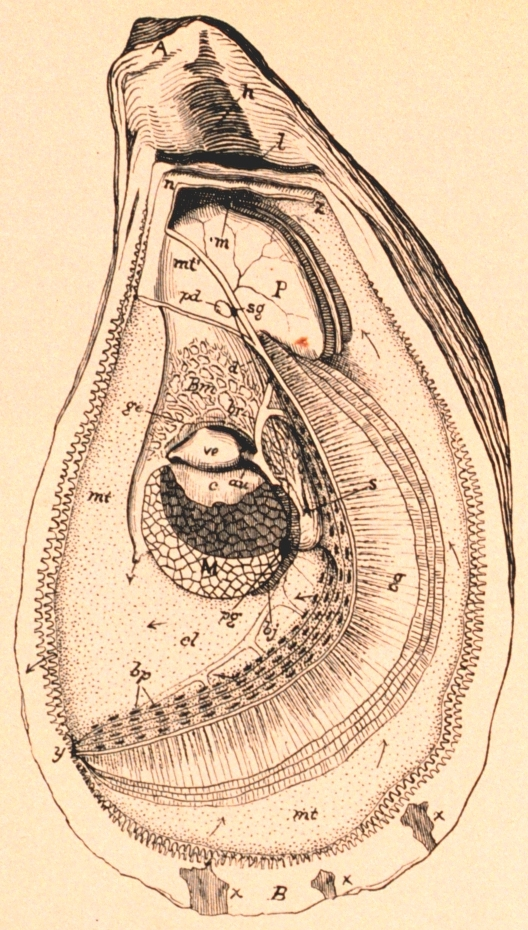
Oyster anatomy

== Pathology ==
Perkinsosis or "dermo" is the disease condition of the oyster. The name "dermo" was coined when the protist was named Dermocystidium marinum, and it is still commonly used. Infested cells are destroyed by the reproducing protist, and many trophozoites are released into the tissues of the host, or into its bloodstream. There, they infest more cells or are excreted or released when the host dies and disintegrates. The infected oyster becomes stressed, its tissues are pale in color, its gamete production is retarded, its growth slows, it becomes emaciated, its mantle shrivels and pulls away from the shell, and it may develop pockets of pus-like fluid. Lysis of tissues and blockage of blood vessels causes fatality, but many oysters can persist up to 3 years with active infections.

== Distribution ==
The protist occurs along the North American coast from New Brunswick to Florida to the Yucatán Peninsula of Mexico. Dermo epizootic outbreaks occurred in the Gulf of Mexico in the 1940s. Periodic outbreaks in the Chesapeake Bay have caused extensive oyster mortality. Significant disease has occurred in Delaware Bay, Long Island Sound, and other parts of the coast of the northeastern United States.

Oyster farming operations have been disrupted in some areas, particularly in Mexico.

== Management ==
The prevalence of the protist and the disease are influenced by environmental factors such as temperature, salinity, and food availability to the hosts. Oysters exposed to environmental pollutants such as N-Nitrosodimethylamine, and tributyltins experience more severe disease. At higher temperatures, the chemical defenses of the oyster, particularly its lysozymes, are reduced; infections are more common and more severe in the summer. Warmer winter ocean temperatures also promote outbreaks.

While laboratory studies of certain antibiotics have been promising, no methods of eradication are effective, so prevention is important. Oysters from populations or farms that have experienced disease should not be moved to areas without infestations, because the protist is easily introduced and transmitted. In aquaculture, efforts to locate and breed more resistant strains of oysters are ongoing. Infested seed oysters should not be planted in oyster beds, and in disease-ridden areas, the oysters should be removed and the site allowed to lie fallow to reduce the protist load.

== See also ==
- Haplosporidium nelsoni (MSX)
