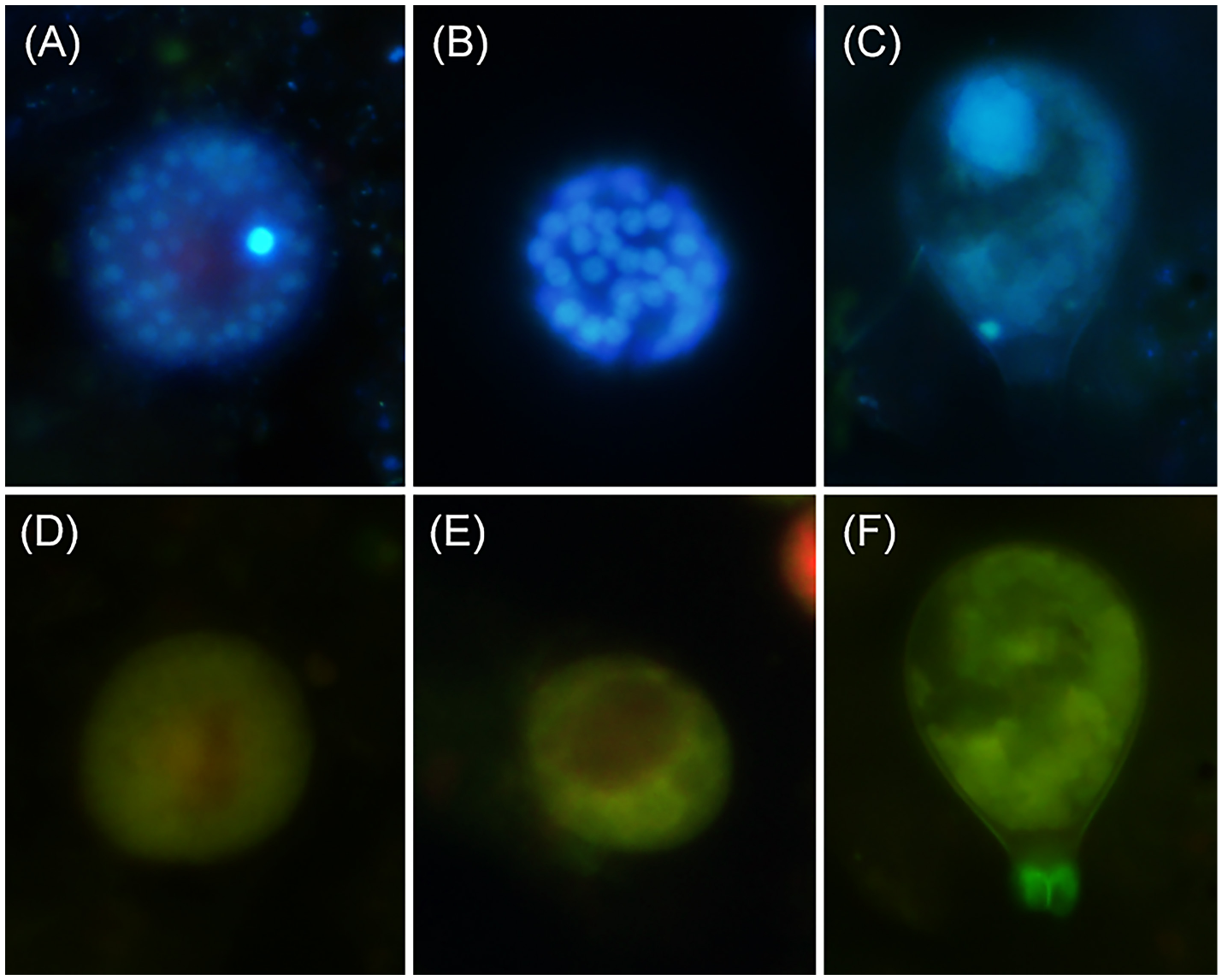
- Parvilucifera spp. (A–C) Sporangia with DAPI-stained nuclei. (D–F) Sporangia with green autofluorescence under blue light excitation.

Scientific classification
- Domain: Eukaryota
- Clade: Sar
- Clade: Alveolata
- Phylum: Perkinsozoa
- Class: Perkinsea
- Family: Parviluciferaceae
- Genus: Parvilucifera; Norén & Moestrup 1999

Type species
- Parvilucifera infectans Norén & Moestrup 1999

Other species
- P. corolla; P. multicavata; P. rostrata

= Parvilucifera =

Genus of single-celled organisms

Parvilucifera is a genus of marine alveolates that behave as endoparasites of dinoflagellates. It was described in 1999 by biologists Fredrik Norén and Øjvind Moestrup, who identified the genus among collections of Dinophysis dinoflagellates off the coast of Sweden. Initially mistaken for products of sexual reproduction, the round bodies found within these collections were eventually recognized as sporangia, spherical structures that generate zoospores of a parasitic protist. This organism was later identified as P. infectans, the type species. The examination of this organism and its close genetic relationship to Perkinsus led to the creation of the Perkinsozoa phylum within the Alveolata group.

The complex life cycle of Parvilucifera consists of biflagellated zoospores that infect a variety of dinoflagellate species, become intracellular feeders or trophonts, and finally develop into sporangia that generate more zoospores. Parvilucifera species could help control dinoflagellate harmful algal blooms.

== Systematics ==
=== Etymology ===
The name of this genus derives from Latin parvus 'small' and lucidus 'shining', referring to the small refractile appearance of the organisms.

=== History ===
The genus was first described by biologists Fredrik Norén and Øjvind Moestrup in 1999. It was isolated off the west coast of Sweden. The discovery was made through collections of Dinophysis dinoflagellates from the coast, which contained round bodies assumed to be products of sexual reproduction. After preservation in the refrigerator for two weeks, the dinoflagellates had all died but the round bodies remained. These were further investigated, and later found to be sporangia of a parasitic protist, later described as Parvilucifera infectans.

Initially, it was assumed that the observed zooids would grow into dinoflagellate cells, and there was much debate that sporangia did not arise from parasites. However, similar observations of the round bodies were made with plankton material from the same Swedish coast, which led to further investigation. Through combined examination of light and electron microscopy, alongside DNA sequencing of the emerging sporangia from the zooids, the organism displayed similarities with Perkinsus, a protist belonging to the Alveolata group (containing dinoflagellates, ciliates, apicomplexans and others). The mysterious zooids differed from dinoflagellates and apicomplexans in the ultrastructure of their flagellum, which led to the creation of a separate new phylum, Perkinsozoa, encompassing Perkinsus and the new genus Parvilucifera.

Following the discovery of P. infectans, the next species to be discovered was P. sinerae, the closest relative to P. infectans. Then followed the discovery of P. prorocentri (today Snorkelia prorocentri), P. rostrata, P. corolla and finally P. multicavata.

=== Classification ===
Parvilucifera is a genus of Alveolata, a diverse clade of eukaryotic microbes (protists) within the SAR supergroup. In particular, it belongs to the Perkinsozoa, a clade closely related to dinoflagellates according to molecular phylogenetics. For decades, this genus has been classified within the order Rastrimonadida as part of the Perkinsea class, without assignment to any family-rank taxon. In 2017, a new family Parviluciferaceae was created to accommodate Parvilucifera and two additional perkinsozoan genera: Dinovorax and Snorkelia.

As of 2020, there are four valid species in this genus. Two species, P. infectans and P. sinerae, have long been considered different species, but were later revealed to be the same through a set of genetic, morphological and ultrastructural data. One species, P. prorocentri, was formerly placed in this genus, but was later transferred to a new genus Snorkelia. Species are differentiated from each other through genetic distance and morphology. For instance, P. multicavata differs from the type species P. infectans by a higher number of apertures in their sporangia, although smaller in diameter. P. rostrata differs by the shape and size of the ornamentations covering the sporangium wall. Lastly, P. corolla is distinguished from others by the radial disposition of the zoospores within the maturing sporangium, among other traits such as the tear-drop shape of the zoospores themselves.

- Parvilucifera corolla Reñé, Alacid, Figueroa, Rodríguez & Garcés 2016
- Parvilucifera infectans Norén & Moestrup 1999 (syn. P. sinerae Figueroa & Garcé 2008)
- Parvilucifera multicavata Jeon & Park 2020
- Parvilucifera rostrata Karpov & Guillou 2013

== Biology and life cycle ==
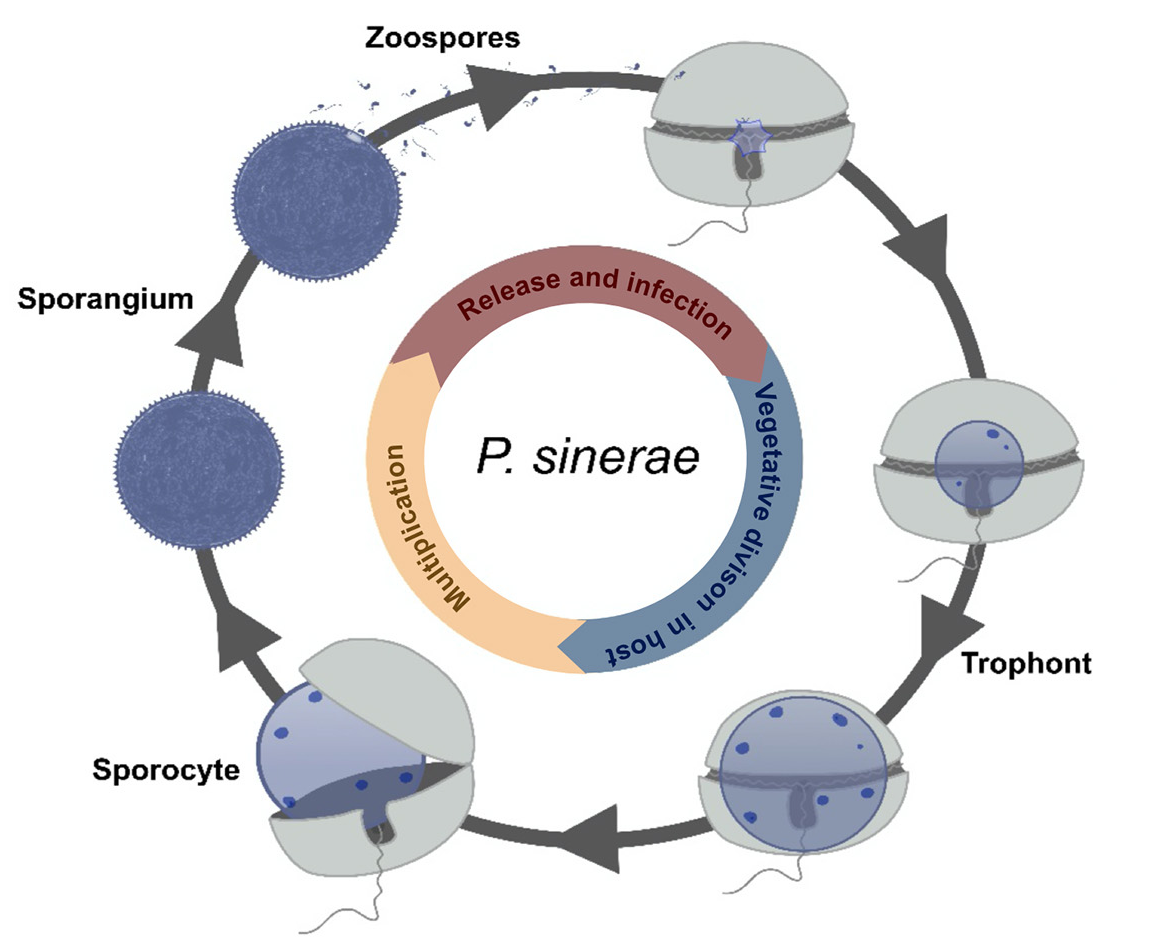
Parvilucifera sinerae infecting its dinoflagellate host

Parvilucifera are single-celled alveolates that behave as endoparasites of dinoflagellates. The overall life cycle of most Parvilucifera species consists of: an infective stage of free-living swimming zoospores, also called zooids; an intracellular feeding stage of trophonts; and the development of a resting sporangium inside the host cell, which in turn generates more zoospores.

=== Zoospores ===
Parvilucifera zoospores, also named zooids, are elongate or tear-shaped and have two flagella. They are characterized by a large refractile body in the posterior part of the cell (hence the name Parvilucifera, meaning "small shining"), probably a starch grain, located within a vacuole. They present two unequal flagella: a long anterior one and a shorter posterior one, both arising from the anterior part of the cell. The two flagella are orthogonal, arising close together, each in a cavity. In addition, the cells contain a stretched nucleus extending from the flagellar insertion to the posterior end. As other alveolates, they also present large mitochondria with tubular cristae, numerous cortical alveoli, and an apical complex. Their apical complex is reduced in comparison to that of apicomplexans, and it includes a pseudo-conoid, rhoptry-like and microneme-like vesicles, similar to those observed in Ichthyodinium, Amoebophrya and Perkinsus. Their pseudo-conoid is a 5-membered sheet-like conoid, and the simplest conoid structure discovered so far among alveolates. These structures likely play a role in the infection of cells, because they are homologous to the structures found in apicomplexans, where the apical complex secretes enzymes that allow them to enter the host cell.

The zoospores of each Parvilucifera species are slightly different from each other. Zoospores of P. corolla are teardrop-shaped, while zoospores of P. infectans/P. sinerae are elongated. The average length is approximately 2.9 μm and width of the zoospores are similar among the three species. The zoospores of P. rostrata show a rostrum, a proboscis-like structure in the apical region, and are larger in size.

=== Infection and trophonts ===
In one species, P. sinerae, the process of infection can follow two different pathways, depending on whether the dinoflagellate host is thecate (i.e. with a protective outer layer of cellulose plates) or athecate. If the dinoflagellate is thecate, then the pathway of infection will be nuclear: the process will follow with the de-attachment of dinoflagellate theca. If the host cell does not have protective plates, then cytoplasmic infection will proceed, indicated by the presence of vacuole-like structures in the cytoplasm and the longer resilience of the host cell.

The endoparasites, once they infect the cell, transform into trophonts and degrade the cytoplasmic contents of the host cell. As the process of feeding continues, the contents of the host cell become entirely degraded or pushed to the outer edges of the cell. As this stage comes to an end, a more or less spherical sporangium develops.

=== Sporangia ===
The size of the sporangium is proportional to the size of the host cell. The surface of the sporangium is ornamented with regularly arranged warts, around 0.6–0.8 μm long. It also presents several simple apertures, each covered by an operculum, unlike the smooth-walled sporangia seen in Perkinsus. The sporangium wall has a complex structure, with a thick innermost layer surrounded by a nearly equal in size or slightly thinner opaque layer in which the warts are embedded. As it matures, the sporangium acquires a blackish colour. Zoospores develop within, either in the dead host cell or after the sporangium is released from the host. The zooids escape through the aforementioned apertures. The number of zooids produced by each sporangium depends on its size, but generally around 500 zooids are released, and it takes 5–10 minutes for all zooids to leave. Afterwards, the cytoplasm from where the zooids were abstricted becomes a residual body left in the sporangium, consisting of starch grains, mitochondria, endoplasmic reticulum and a large central nucleus-like area.

== Ecology ==
=== Habitat ===
The presence of Parvilucifera, along with other Perkinsozoa, has been demonstrated in fresh water, marine waters, and sediments. P. infectans has been found in coastal Sweden where it was first discovered, especially being commonly found in marine sediment.

Through experimental studies, it has been found that lower salinity levels possibly promote a higher infection rate. Two species, P. infectans and P. sinerae, are able to survive extreme conditions in their sporangium phase, due to the resilience of the host cyst which can protect the zoospores. The sporangia are able to survive cold temperatures for many months.

=== Host range ===
All species of Parvilucifera are considered generalist parasites for dinoflagellates, meaning that they are able to infect a wide range of dinoflagellate species. The only exception was a species formerly included in this genus, Snorkelia prorocentri, which specialized in the dinoflagellate Prorocentrum fukuyoi. However, studies are increasingly pointing towards preferences for particular species of dinoflagellates.

=== Importance in algal blooms ===
The practical importance of Parvilucifera is a topic of interest, as the genus is demonstrated to be a controlling factor of many harmful algal blooms of dinoflagellates. Dinoflagellate blooms have been known to be harmful to the shellfish industry and responsible for producing potent toxins. Some dinoflagellates are also known to create massive faunal mortality and can even be fatal for humans. Parvilucifera species have a generalist dinoflagellate host range, and thus could serve as negative regulators of dinoflagellate communities. There is research underway to understand the specific host ranges for each species in order to better control dinoflagellate blooms.
