= Colponema vietnamica =

Scientific classification
- Domain: Eukaryota
- Clade: Sar
- Clade: Alveolata
- Order: Colponemida
- Family: Colponemidae
- Genus: Colponema
- Species: C. vietnamica

Binomial name
- Colponema vietnamica Tikhonenkov et al., 2014

Predatory biflagellate protist from Vietnamese wetlands

Colponema vietnamica is a small and free-living predatory protist described in 2014 from freshwater wetland sediments in Cát Tiên National Park, Vietnam.

== Morphology ==
Cells are elongated-oval and rigid, typically measuring 10.5–14.5 μm in length and 5.0–6.5 μm in width. Unlike some related species, the cell is not dorsoventrally flattened. Two heterodynamic flagella arise from a relatively short anterior ventral groove. Both flagella possess narrowed tips known as "acronemes", and the posterior flagellum undulates within the ventral groove, a feature associated with feeding.

== Ecology and feeding ==
Colponema vietnamica is an obligate eukaryovore, meaning it feeds exclusively on other eukaryotic organisms (such as small heterotrophic flagellates like Spumella) and does not consume bacteria. It employs a predatory strategy involving active hunting and engulfment of intact prey via the ventral groove (phagocytosis), rather than the myzocytosis (suck-feeding) seen in some other alveolate lineages.

== Evolutionary significance ==
The origin of the Alveolata is a major evolutionary and ecological concern in protistology. In the scientific community, researchers have a strong stereotype linking alveolates to three specific morphologies: ciliates, dinoflagellates, and apicomplexans. A variety of studies has focused on traits such as myzocytosis and plastids that might play a role in their ecological success. However, there is still no clear phylogenetic evidence suggesting what the Last Alveolate Common Ancestor (LACA) looked like, even though there is a strong hypothesis regarding a photosynthetic ancestry.

Fortunately, Colponema vietnamica, a species isolated from the Bàu Sấu wetland complex, offers a unique opportunity to mine the ancestral biological traits in this lineage and examine their relationships with derived alveolate groups. Consequently, recent research aims to integrate genomic approaches with ultrastructural experiments to investigate whether the colponemids exhibit the ancestral state of the supergroup.

At first, studies compared the morphology of C. vietnamica with other lineages, identifying the ventral groove and toxicysts as plesiomorphic traits supporting phagocytosis. Simultaneously, phylogenomic analyses using datasets of 313 protein-coding genes placed C. vietnamica as the sister group to all other alveolates. In these datasets, the candidate proteins associated with ancestral translation mechanisms, specifically EF1A, were identified, distinguishing it from the EFL-encoding dinoflagellates. Finally, understanding the reason of the absence of plastid genome in this protist might help us understand more about the feeding strategy evolution in Alveolata.

Overall, the common ancestor of Alveolata is more supported to be a predator and elucidate the relationship of feeding strategies with the evolution of parasitism. These findings reveal not only the scientific validity of the "predatory ancestor" but also contribute to our understanding of major transitions in eukaryotic evolution.

== See also ==
- Phylogenomics
