= Perkinsidae =

Scientific classification
- Domain: Eukaryota
- Clade: Sar
- Clade: Alveolata
- Phylum: Perkinsozoa
- Class: Perkinsea
- Order: Perkinsida
- Family: Perkinsidae; Levine, 1978

Genera
- 2, see text

Family of single-celled organisms

Perkinsidae is a family of alveolates in the phylum Perkinsozoa, a sister group to the dinoflagellates.

== Members ==
It includes Perkinsus species, which are parasitic protozoans, some of which cause disease and mass mortality in wild and farmed molluscs such as oysters.

There are two genera:

- Perkinsus, a genus of 7 to 8 species
- Psammosa, a genus of 2 species

== Characteristics ==
Perkinsidae possess plastids which do not contain DNA.
