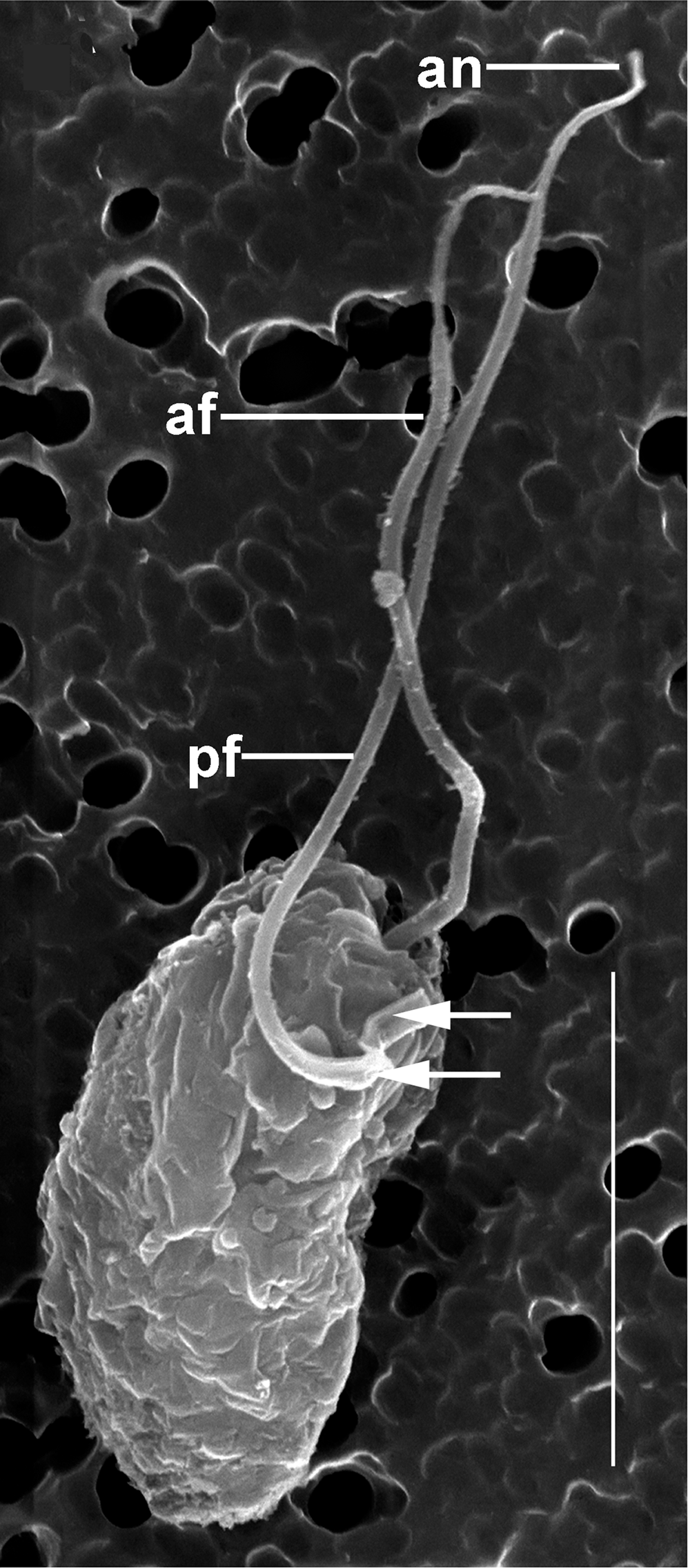
- SEM image of Colponema vietnamica showing anterior (af) and posterior (pf) flagella, and an acroneme (an).

Scientific classification
- Domain: Eukaryota
- Clade: Sar
- Clade: Halvaria
- Clade: Alveolata

Groups included
- Acavomonas; Colponema; Loeffela; Neocolponema; Palustrimonas

Cladistically included but traditionally excluded taxa
- Ciliophora; Myzozoa

= Colponemid =

Colponemids

Group of predatorial flagellates

Colponemids are free-living alveolates, unicellular flagellates related to dinoflagellates, apicomplexans and ciliates. They are predators of other small eukaryotes, found in freshwater, marine and soil environments. They do not form a solid clade, but a sparse group of deep-branching alveolate lineages.

== Biology ==
Colponemids are flagellated unicellular protists, 8 to 30 μm long, with rounded cell bodies that bear two heterodynamic flagella for rapid swimming. They are only present as swimming cells during their life cycle. Reproduction or resting cysts are unknown.

=== Cell structure ===
As other alveolates, all colponemids exhibit cortical alveoli and tubular mitochondrial cristae. They present a three-membrane alveolar pellicle without fibrils, theca or micropores. Within the cell is a vesicular nucleus with a central nucleolus, as well as a very large digestive vacuole (or food vacuole) located at the posterior end of the cell, and a contractile vacuole at the anterior end. In addition, the cytoplasm contains flask-shaped extrusomes. The anterior flagellum has thin non-hollow mastigonemes at its base (or proximal end), unlike the hollow tripartite mastigonemes found in stramenopiles. The posterior flagellum has a fold or 'vane'.

As many basal eukaryotes, they present a ventral groove for feeding, tiny in Loeffela, substantial in Palustrimonas and absent in Acavomonas. Supporting this longitudinal groove are two microtubule bands.

=== Feeding ===
All colponemids share a raptorial predatory lifestyle, where they move actively to encounter and capture their prey. Prey cells are ingested through the anterior region of the ventral groove, on the right side of the cell (i.e. to the right of the posterior flagellum). During the early stages of phagocytosis, flask-shaped extrusomes within the colponemid cell seem to play a role in subduing the much larger prey cells.

== Ecology ==
Colponemids are found in freshwater, marine and soil environments. They are obligate eukaryovores or eukaryotrophs, free-living predators that feed on other microscopic eukaryotes by capturing and ingesting entire cells.

== Evolution ==
Colponemid phylogeny

- - - - - Myzozoa (apicomplexans & dinoflagellates)
        - Neocolponema
      - Palustrimonas
      - - Ciliophora (ciliates)
        - Acavomonas
    - Colponema
  - Loeffela

Cladogram of Alveolata showing the position of colponemid genera (in bold). Based on a 2023 phylogenetic analysis using SSU rDNA sequences.

Colponemids are not a clade, i.e. do not form an independent evolutionary lineage within eukaryotes. Instead, they are a series of deep-branching lineages spread within the larger Alveolata group. Phylogenetic analyses recover some colponemids at the base of Myzozoa (the clade uniting apicomplexans and dinoflagellates), such as Acavomonas, while others appear at the base of all alveolates.

The method of feeding in colponemids perhaps represents the ancestral alveolate state, preceding myzocytosis in their myzozoan relatives. In addition, they possibly constitute the evolutionary link to more basal protists with ventral grooves used in feeding, i.e. 'excavates' (such as metamonads, jakobids and malawimonads). These basal organisms feed on suspended particles driving them into their ventral groove by the beating of their posterior flagellum, an arrangement comparable to that seen among colponemids during feeding. However, there are large differences between their feeding processes. Namely, colponemids are not suspension feeders, and phagocytosis occurs in their anterior end, not the posterior end as in excavates.

== Classification ==
Due to the non-monophyletic nature of this group of protists, a new method of classification was proposed in 2014 which divided the Alveolata clade in four phyla: Myzozoa, Acavomonidia (with the newly described genus Acavomonas), Colponemidia (with the genus Colponema) and Ciliophora. This change was proposed to strive away from the paraphyletic taxon "Colponemida" and instead group each colponemid lineage in its own separate phylum. In 2023, three more genera were added to colponemids: newly described Loeffela and Neocolponema. Currently, five genera of colponemids are recognised:

- Acavomonas Tikhonenkov et al. 2014 – 1 sp.
- Colponema von Stein 1878 – at least 5 spp.
- Loeffela Gigeroff et al. 2023 – 1 sp.
- Neocolponema Gigeroff et al. 2023 – 1 sp.
- Palustrimonas Patterson & Simpson 1996 – 1 sp.
