= Voromonas =

Scientific classification
- Domain: Eukaryota
- Clade: Sar
- Clade: Alveolata
- Division: Chromerida
- Class: Colpodellophyceae
- Order: Colpodellida
- Family: Colpodellaceae
- Genus: Voromonas; Cavalier-Smith & Chao 2004
- Species: V. pontica

Binomial name
- Voromonas pontica (Mylnikov 2000) Cavalier-Smith & Chao 2004

Synonyms
- Colpodella pontica Mylnikov 2000

Genus of single-celled organisms

Voromonas is a genus of predatory alveolates. The genus and species were described by Mylnikov in 2000. It was originally described as Colpodella pontica but was later renamed by Cavalier-Smith and Chao in 2004.

== Taxonomy ==
There is one species known in this genus.

A DNA based analysis suggests that this species may be related to the Colpodella.

== Feeding ==
At the anterior end of the protozoan, this organism manifests a rostrum which contains a microtubular structure (the pseudoconoid) The pseudoconoid forms an open cone and which is located adjacent to microtubular bands, micronemes and rhoptries. The pseudoconoid begins near the kinetosomes of the flagella and passes along the flagellate pocket into the rostrum.

While feeding on prey organisms the rostrum is inserted into the body of the prey and the cytoplasm is sucked out. Known prey organisms include bodonids, chrysomonads, percolomonads. Known non prey organisms include naked amoebas, ciliates, cryptomonads and colorless euglenoids.
