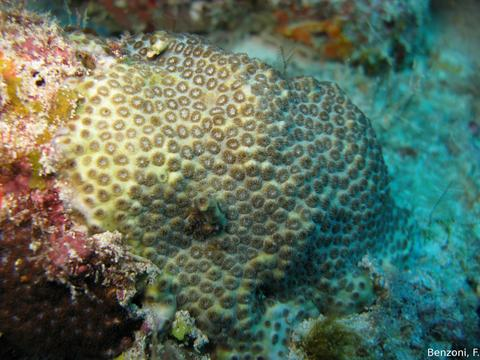
- Plesiastrea versipora

Scientific classification
- Kingdom: Animalia
- Phylum: Cnidaria
- Subphylum: Anthozoa
- Class: Hexacorallia
- Order: Scleractinia
- Family: Plesiastreidae; Dai & Horng, 2009
- Genus: Plesiastrea; Milne Edwards & Haime, 1848

Species
- See text

Synonyms
- Plesiastraea Milne Edwards & Haime, 1848 [lapsus]

= Plesiastrea =

Genus of corals

Plesiastraea is a genus of corals. It is the only genus in the monotypic family Plesiastreidae.

== Species ==
The following species are recognized in the genus Plesiastraea:

- †Plesiastrea costata (Duncan, 1880)
- †Plesiastrea decipiens (Duncan, 1880)
- †Plesiastrea pedunculata (Duncan, 1880)
- Plesiastrea versipora (Lamarck, 1816)
