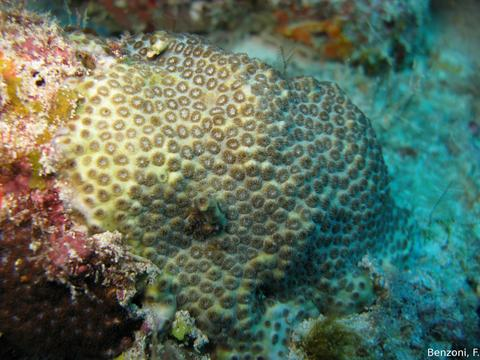

Conservation status
- Least Concern (IUCN 3.1)

Scientific classification
- Kingdom: Animalia
- Phylum: Cnidaria
- Subphylum: Anthozoa
- Class: Hexacorallia
- Order: Scleractinia
- Family: Plesiastreidae
- Genus: Plesiastrea
- Species: P. versipora

Binomial name
- Plesiastrea versipora Lamarck, 1816

Synonyms
- List: Astraea versipora Lamarck, 1816; Astrea versipora Lamarck, 1816; Favia ingolfi Crossland, 1931; Favia versipora (Lamarck, 1816); Orbicella gravieri Vaughan, 1918; Orbicella versipora (Lamarck, 1816); Plesiastraea quatrefagesana Milne Edwards & Haime, 1849; Plesiastrea peroni Milne Edwards & Haime, 1857; Plesiastrea proximans Dennant, 1904; Plesiastrea quatrefagiana Milne Edwards & Haime, 1849; Plesiastrea urvillei Edwards & Haime, 1849

= Plesiastrea versipora =

Stony encrusting coral

Plesiastrea versipora is an encrusting coral found in the Indian and Pacific Oceans. It is of interest because of its ability to thrive in both tropical and temperate environments, and to grow massive.

Existing massive colonies of P. versipora can be long lived, and so analysis of their internal composition allows deducing the climatic records of past decades and centuries, at localities where the corals grow. Being the only coral genus in temperate waters that is capable of growing massive (up to a metre in thickness), P. versipora is a valuable indicator of climatic records of temperate seas.

Plesiastrea versipora is also a model for communication between corals and their zooxanthellae. The substances that communicate to the symbiont are host-generated soluble compounds which can either signal the release of photosynthetic products (mainly glycerol) by the zooxanthellae, or can inhibit photosynthesis. This phenomenon may potentially be generalised to other coral genera, as identical Symbiodinium strains often occur in several coral host genera. P. versipora is the type host for a newly described minor symbiont Chromera velia, which is present in small numbers in a host P. versipora coral colony, compared to the dominant Symbiodinium which is present in large numbers, to the point where C. velia cells may be barely detectable in the host except by culturing.

The host P. versipora reproduces sexually, with larvae obtaining symbiotic algae from the environment, though anecdotal evidence shows some symbionts may also be a transmitted via the eggs, indicating transmission may be mixed in this host species.

The species adopts a range of colours, being host pigments that protect the coral from ultraviolet radiation. Colonies often occur close to one another, and contact one another. The range of colour morphs of P. versipora is broad and so it is very often obvious by their colours where one colony begins and another ends.
