= Acrocoelus =

Scientific classification
- Domain: Eukaryota
- Clade: Sar
- Clade: Alveolata
- Phylum: Perkinsozoa
- Class: Perkinsea
- Order: Acrocoelida; Cavalier-Smith in Cavalier-Smith & Chao 2004
- Genus: Acrocoelus; Fernández et al. 1999
- Species: A. glossobalani

Binomial name
- Acrocoelus glossobalani Fernández et al. 1999

Genus of single-celled organisms

Acrocoelus is a genus of alveolates.

== History ==
This genus was named in 1999 by Fernández and collaborators.

== Description ==
The species in this genus are fusiform with an apical anterior concavity and a longitudinal groove. There are two anterior flagellae directed backward. The flagellae arise from parallel basal bodies in a flagellar pocket.

The single nucleus has a single nucleolus.

The cell wall is a trilaminate pellicle with subpellicular microtubules and a micropore.

The cytoplasm contains a single, branched mitochondrion with tubular cristae, a supranuclear Golgi apparatus and large amounts of glycan granules.

There are three types of secretory organelles present. Type I are round and structurally complex. These may be extrusomes. The types II and III appear to be rhoptry and microneme like organelles respectively.

== Taxonomy ==
The type species is Acrocoelus glossobalani I.Fernández, Pardos, Jes.Benito & N.L.Arroyo, 1999.
