= Perkinsus =

Scientific classification
- Domain: Eukaryota
- Clade: Sar
- Clade: Alveolata
- Phylum: Perkinsozoa
- Class: Perkinsea
- Order: Perkinsida
- Family: Perkinsidae
- Genus: Perkinsus; Levine, 1978

Genus of single-celled organisms

Perkinsus is a genus of alveolates in the phylum Perkinsozoa. The genus was erected in 1978 to better treat its type species, Perkinsus marinus, known formerly as Dermocystidium marinum. These are parasitic protozoans that infect molluscs, at least some of which cause disease and mass mortality. P. marinus is the most notorious, causing the disease perkinsosis, or dermo, in wild and farmed oysters.

== Description ==
Perkinsus is a genus in the class Perkinsea that is a parasite of bivalve molluscs; it displays a number of features typical of the dinoflagellates including laterally inserted heterodynamic flagella,. However, it has been settled that Perkinsus does not belong to the phylum Dinoflagellata, but rather into the phylum Perkinsozoa, which is the sister group of dinoflagellates.

== Classification ==
As of 2004, six valid species were in the genus. At least two more have been described since then.

Species and common hosts include:

- Perkinsus andrewsi on Baltic clam (Macoma balthica)
- Perkinsus beihaiensis on the oysters Magallana hongkongensis and M. ariakensis
- Perkinsus chesapeaki on soft-shell clam (Mya arenaria)
- Perkinsus honshuensis on Manila clam (Venerupis philippinarum)
- Perkinsus marinus on eastern oyster (Crassostrea virginica)
- Perkinsus mediterraneus on European flat oyster (Ostrea edulis)
- Perkinsus olseni (syn. P. atlanticus) on blacklip abalone (Haliotis rubra) and grooved carpet shell (Ruditapes decussatus)
- Perkinsus qugwadii on yesso scallop (Patinopecten yessoensis)

P. andrewsi and P. chesapeaki might be the same species; because the latter was described first, the name P. andrewsi will be a synonym.
