= Rastrimonas =

Scientific classification
- Domain: Eukaryota
- (unranked): SAR
- (unranked): Alveolata
- Phylum: Perkinsozoa
- Class: Perkinsea
- Order: Rastrimonadida
- Family: Rastrimonadidae
- Genus: Rastrimonas Brugerolle 2003
- Species: R. subtilis

Binomial name
- Rastrimonas subtilis (Brugerolle 2002) Brugerolle 2003

Synonyms
- Cryptophagus Brugerolle 2002 non Herbst 1863 non Rafinesque 1815 nomen nudum; Cryptophagus subtilis Brugerolle 2002

Genus of single-celled organisms

Rastrimonas is a monotypic genus of parasitic alveolates in the phylum Apicomplexa. It contains the single species Rastrimonas subtilis. It was described in 2002 from the free-living cryptomonad Chilomonas paramaecium and placed in the new genus Cryptophagus. The following year this was renamed Rastrimonas.
