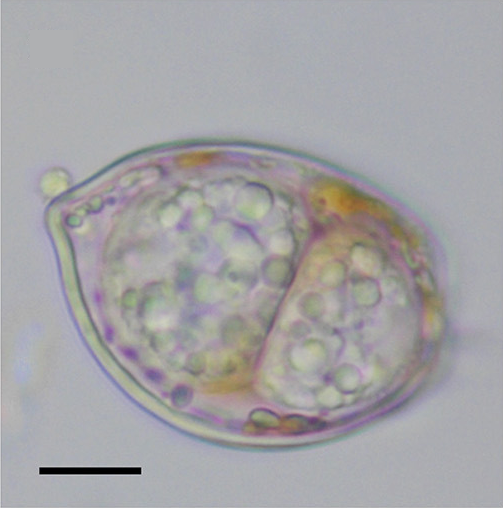
- Symbiosis between two dinozoans: the perkinsid Dinovorax pyriformis infecting the dinoflagellate Prorocentrum micans

Scientific classification
- Domain: Eukaryota
- Clade: Sar
- Clade: Alveolata
- Clade: Myzozoa
- Clade: Dinozoa; Cavalier-Smith 1981, emend. 2004

Phyla
- Dinoflagellata; Perkinsozoa

= Dinozoa =

Clade of eukaryotes

Dinozoa is a group of microorganisms composed of dinoflagellates and perkinsids. It was initially coined in 1981 as a synonym of dinoflagellates, but in 2004 the name was repurposed for the evolutionary lineage or clade of dinoflagellates and their closest relatives, the perkinsids.
