= International Phycological Society =

International learned society

The International Phycological Society is a learned society of phycologists. It was established in 1960. The Society publishes a bimonthly academic journal Phycologia.
