= Perkinsida =

Scientific classification
- Domain: Eukaryota
- Clade: Sar
- Clade: Alveolata
- Phylum: Perkinsozoa
- Class: Perkinsea
- Order: Perkinsida

Order of single-celled organisms

Perkinsida is an order of alveolates in the phylum Perkinsozoa.
