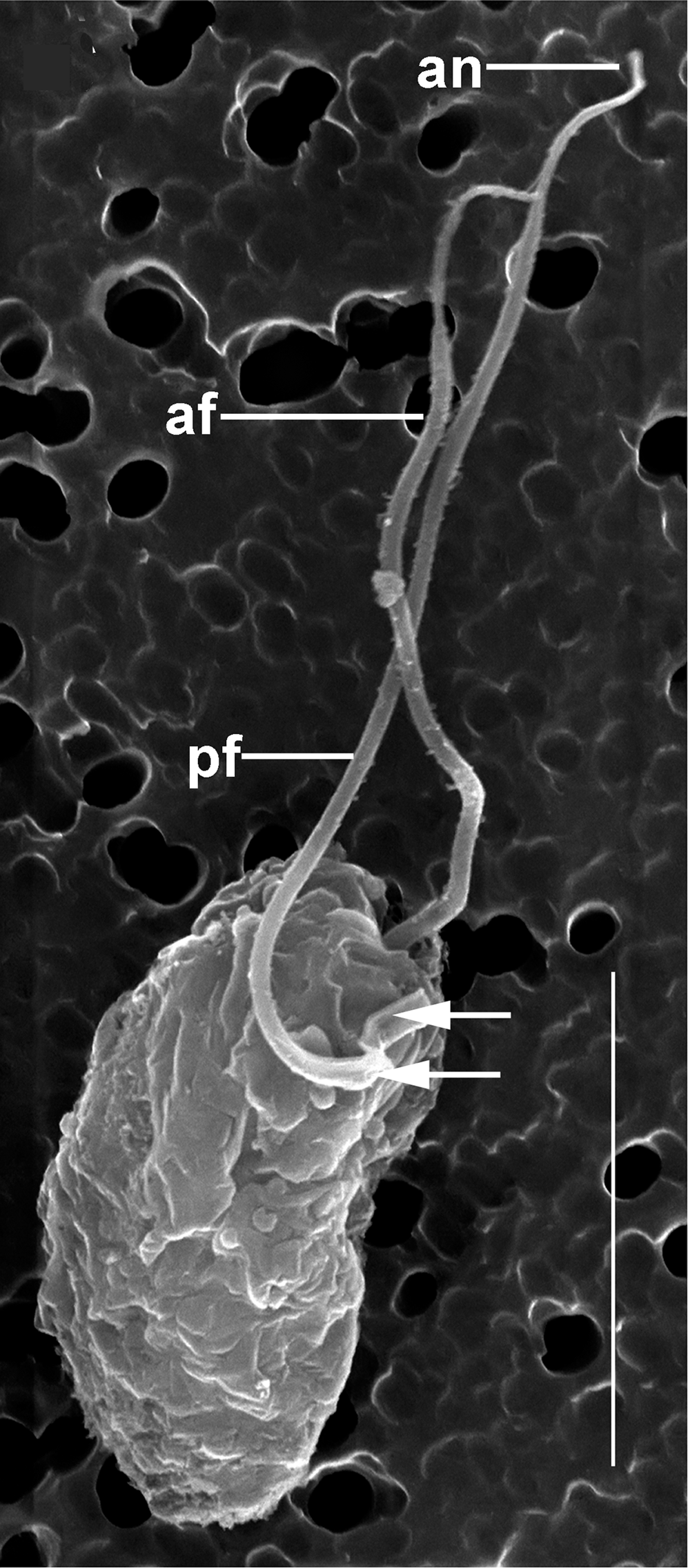

Scientific classification
- Domain: Eukaryota
- Clade: Sar
- Clade: Alveolata
- Phylum: Colponemidia; Tikhonenkov et al. 2014
- Class: Colponemea; Cavalier-Smith 1993, emend. Tikhonenkov et al. 2014
- Order: Colponemida; Cavalier-Smith 1993
- Family: Colponemidae; Cavalier-Smith & Chao 2004
- Genus: Colponema; Stein, 1878

Synonyms
- Stroemia Skvortzov & Noda 1968 non Vahl 1790 non Hagen 1908 non Oudemans 1923

= Colponema =

Genus of single-celled alveolates

Colponema is a genus of single-celled flagellates that feed on eukaryotes in aquatic environments and soil. The genus contains 6 known species and has not been thoroughly studied. Colponema has two flagella which originate just below the anterior end of the cell. One extends forwards and the other runs through a deep groove in the surface and extends backwards. Colponema is a predator that feeds on smaller flagellates using its ventral groove. Like many other alveolates, they possess trichocysts, tubular mitochondrial cristae, and alveoli. It has been recently proposed that Colponema may be the sister group to all other alveolates. The genus could help us understand the origin of alveolates and shed light on features that are ancestral to all eukaryotes.

== Etymology ==
Colponema is a compound of the Greek words 'kolpos' and 'nema'. 'Kolpos' means fold or hollow and is likely referring to the pronounced groove present in Colponema. 'Nema' means thread and alludes to the organism's recurrent flagellum, which originates at the anterior end of the cell and passes through the groove. Although the initial description of Colponema does not explicitly provide an explanation of its etymology, the publication does highlight the organism's large abdominal groove and the figures show the flagellum going through it.

== History ==
Colponema was first described by Dr. Friedrich Ritter Stein in 1878 in "Der Organismus der Flagellaten", which contained a number of protist species descriptions. Colponema loxodes was described in just one line, which stated that there was a large abdominal groove and made reference to a figure depicting the organism from different angles. Following the initial conception of the genus, new species C. globosum and C. symmetricum were described. The ultrastructure of colponemids was not discussed in detail until 1975 with Mignot and Brugerolle's study of C. loxodes. The remaining species, C. edaphicum, C. vietnamica, and C. marisrubri were introduced to the genus in recent years, and phylogenetic analyses allowed researchers to use Colponema to ask questions about alveolate evolution.

C. marisrubri was, however, proven to be a member of Provora, and was first renamed to Ancoracysta marisrubri, then to Nebulomonas marisrubri.

== Habitat and ecology ==
Colponema is a single-celled predator that has been found in lakes, soil, reservoirs, marine sediment, and sewage waters. It is an obligate eukaryovore, meaning that it can only feed on other eukaryotes such as bodonids and does not tend to eat larger prey or bacteria. Their primary role in ecosystems is controlling the numbers of smaller flagellates. It is likely that larger eukaryotes and small animals are its primary predators, but the details of Colponema's ecological role have yet to be characterized because it is relatively rare and difficult to culture. The genus' scarcity further supports its position as a predator in the microbial food chain; predators are often present in smaller numbers because large amounts of prey are needed to sustain their population.

== Description ==
Colponema is a colorless biflagellate with a pronounced ventral feeding groove. Cell size ranges from 4-14 μm in width and 8-17 μm in length and they have an oval shape that narrows at the anterior end. The cells have 1 μm long toxicysts, a type of organelle that is extruded from the cell and are used to immobilize prey. Species of Colponema vary in the presence of a contractile vacuoles, degree of dorsoventral flattening, and the length of flagella.

The flagella are heterodynamic and originate just below the anterior of the cell. One flagellum points towards the anterior end of the cell and has mastigonemes near the base. The other has a fold near the base and runs through the cell's feeding groove to point posteriorly. Prey are engulfed whole through the feeding groove and digested in large food vacuoles.

Similar to other alveolates, the pellicle of Colponema is composed of three membranes and contains inflated cortical alveoli. They also have tubular cristae in their mitochondria. In contrast, the cells do not share important traits that characterize the other groups of alveolates, such as rhoptries, derived ciliature, or palintomy.

No resting stages or sexual reproduction has been observed in culture. Asexual reproduction occurs through longitudinal division, wherein the plane of division is parallel to the groove in the cell. They are only able to divide after engulfing many other eukaryotes.

== Importance ==
From high profile diseases like malaria to maintenance of bacterial communities in water reservoirs, alveolates can have sweeping medical and economic impacts. By looking into lineages that diverged during evolutionary transitions near the origin of alveolates, scientists can develop a better understanding of how the group evolved. Colponema is very useful to understanding of alveolate evolution because they were one of the first groups to diverge and display key characters that can be used to compare them to other alveolates. This information can be used to work towards reconstructing the common ancestor to all alveolates and broadening understanding of these extremely important and widespread organisms.

== List of species ==
- Colponema agitans Davis 1947
- Colponema brasiliana (Skvortzov & Noda 1969) Bicudo 1991
- Colponema edaphicum Mylnikov & Tikhonenkov 2007
- Colponema globosum De Faria, Cunha & Pinto 1922
- Colponema loxodes Stein 1878
- Colponema subsphaerica (Skvortzov & Noda 1969) Bicudo 1991
- Colponema symmetricum Sandon 1927
- Colponema vietnamica Tikhonenkov, Mylnikov & Keeling in Tikhonenkov et al. 2014
