= Øjvind Moestrup =

Danish botanist (born 1941)

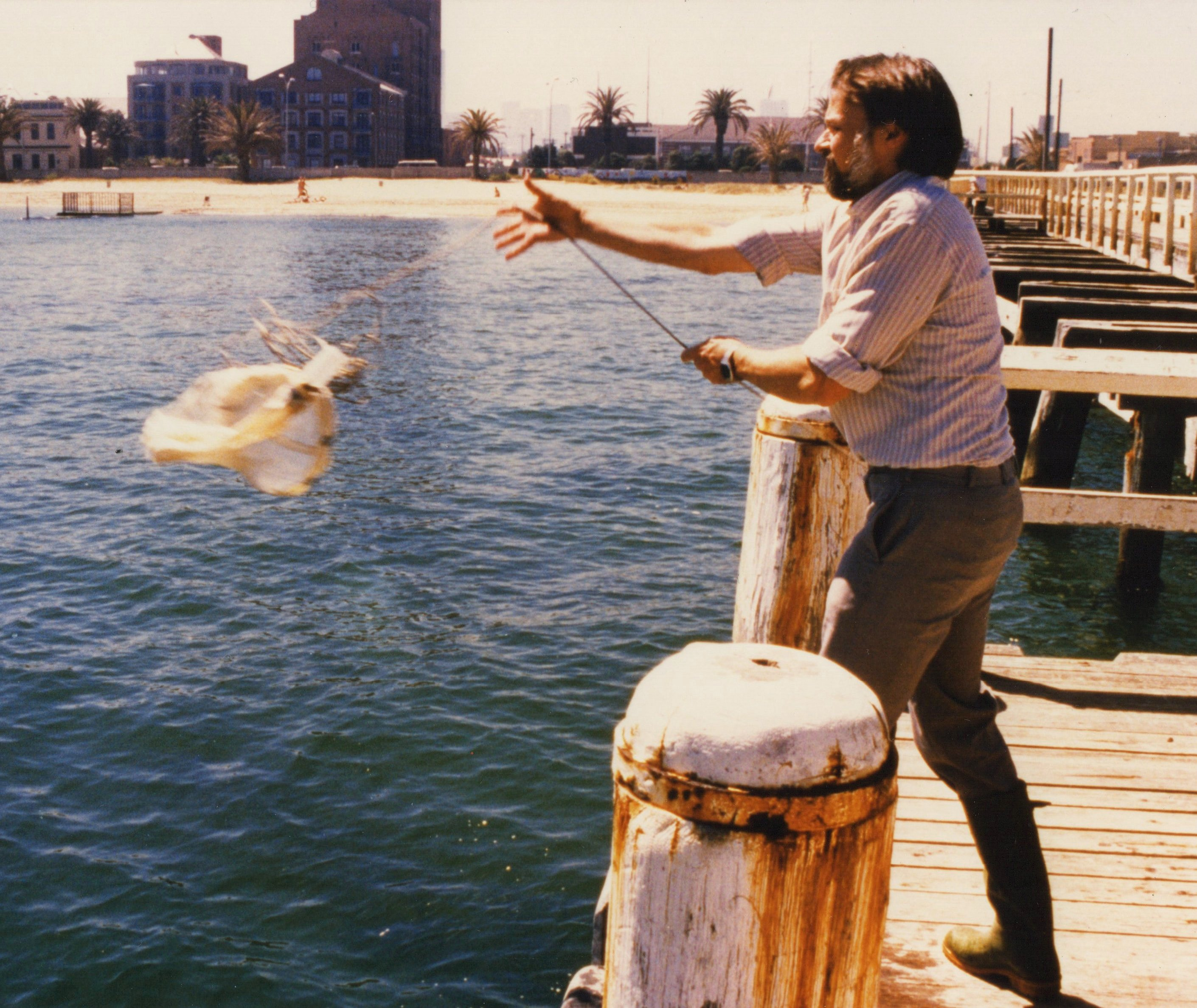
- Moestrup sampling phytoplankton in Adelaide, Australia, 1988
- Born: 15 December 1941 (age 84); Marvede Parish, Denmark
- Alma mater: University of Copenhagen
- Known for: Ultrastructure, taxonomy and evolution of microalgae; taxonomy of harmful algae
- Awards: Order of the Dannebrog (2006); Yasumoto Lifetime Achievement Award (2012)
- Scientific career
- Fields: Phycology, botany
- Workplaces: University of Copenhagen
- Doctoral students: Niels Daugbjerg, Nina Lundholm, Gert Hansen
- Author abbrev. (botany): Moestrup

Øjvind Moestrup (born 15 December 1941) is a Danish aquatic botanist and phycologist, working particularly with the classification of algae. He is a professor emeritus in the Department of Biology at the University of Copenhagen, where he was formerly director of the Botanical Institute.

Moestrup trained in electron microscopy under Irene Manton at the University of Leeds and has studied the ultrastructure of algae since. His work has centred on small flagellates, including haptophytes, green flagellates and dinoflagellates, and later combined ultrastructural studies with molecular methods. Through the IOC Science and Communication Centre on Harmful Algae in Copenhagen and the IOC taxonomic reference list of harmful microalgae, he contributed to training and communication on the taxonomy of harmful algae.

Moestrup was chief editor of the journal Phycologia from 1992 to 1996. He received the Yasumoto Lifetime Achievement Award of the International Society for the Study of Harmful Algae in 2012 and was elected to the Royal Danish Academy of Sciences and Letters in 1992. In 2006 he was awarded the Order of the Dannebrog by Queen Margrethe II.

== Early life and education ==
Moestrup was born on 15 December 1941 in Marvede Parish, Denmark, and grew up on the island of Funen and in Jutland, where his father was a vicar. He began studying biology at the University of Copenhagen in 1962, with a particular interest in zoology, and initially planned to write his master's thesis on the cytology of flatworms. In 1965 Professor Tyge Christensen asked him to consider a position as demonstrator at the Institut for Sporeplanter (the Institute for Spore Plants, also described as the Department of Phycology and Mycology) at the university, which he accepted.

In 1967 Christensen suggested that Moestrup accept an open invitation from Irene Manton, who was at the time the leading expert on the ultrastructure of algae, to learn electron microscopy at the University of Leeds. Moestrup spent 13 months at Leeds, in 1968 and 1969, where he learned the techniques needed to study the fine structure of algae, and he has worked in this field ever since. His master's thesis dealt with the ultrastructure of the genus Vaucheria and showed that it belonged among the golden-green algae. He received a higher doctorate (DSc) in biology from the University of Copenhagen in 1983, based on his work on the flagellar apparatus of algae (see below).

== Academic career ==
Moestrup was an assistant professor at the Institut for Sporeplanter from 1970 to 1974, during which time he studied spermatozoids in several groups of algae. In 1974, at the age of 33, he was appointed chairman of the Department of Botany, a post he held until 1976, and he later chaired the Institut for Sporeplanter on three occasions: 1976 to 1979, 1985 to 1987 and 1989 to 1991. He spent a year at the University of Canterbury in Christchurch, New Zealand, in 1979 and 1980, where part of his doctoral work was written, and a sabbatical year at the University of Melbourne in 1987 and 1988, hosted by Rick Wetherbee. In January–April 1991 he spent three months at the University of Tsukuba in Japan, a visit that led to extensive cooperation with Japanese colleagues. From 1991 he was professor of biology at the University of Copenhagen. He is now professor emeritus.

Alongside these appointments, Moestrup took part in university governance. He was a member of the Faculty Council from 1977 to 1980 and of the University Senate from 1980 to 1986, and from 1999 to 2004 he was director of the Botanical Institute. He has supervised 47 master's students and 20 PhD students, and he has also worked with the Fish Inspection Service of the Danish Ministry of Fisheries. His PhD students include Niels Daugbjerg, Gert Hansen, Nina Lundholm, Helge A. Thomsen, Marianne Ellegaard and António Calado, who is now a leading specialist on freshwater dinoflagellates. He has published well over 200 scientific papers.

Moestrup was chief editor of Phycologia from 1992 to 1996 and later served again as an associate editor of the journal. He has also chaired three international meetings: the 2nd International Phycological Congress, a first international conference on cyanobacteria, and, in 2006, the 12th International Conference on Harmful Algae.

== Scientific research ==
Moestrup's major areas of research include the taxonomy of planktonic algae, haptophytes, toxic diatoms and raphidophytes.

=== Electron microscopy and algal ultrastructure ===
After his training at Leeds, Moestrup applied transmission electron microscopy to the fine structure of algae, beginning with Vaucheria and, during his time as assistant professor, the spermatozoids of several algal groups. Later studies included the flagellar root system of the raphidophyte Heterosigma akashiwo, published with M. Vesk in 1987.

=== Nanoflagellates and haptophytes ===
In 1972 a new transmission electron microscope was sponsored by the Danish Research Council, after which Moestrup's work moved to nanoflagellates, small flagellated cells of the plankton. ISSHA states that this work was inspired by a bloom at Kaikōura, New Zealand. His 1979 paper in the New Zealand Journal of Botany identified marine nanoplankton from New Zealand by electron microscopy and described four new species: the haptophytes (prymnesiophytes) Chrysochromulina novae-zelandiae and Phaeocystis scrobiculata, the choanoflagellate Bicosta antennigera, and Petasaria heterolepis, a flagellate of unknown affinities. The type material of C. novae-zelandiae came from plankton collected at Kaikōura on 13 September 1974, and in the original description the species was reported to be common in Kaikōura plankton and not yet known from elsewhere.

Moestrup's later haptophyte work included the description, with Helge A. Thomsen, of Chrysochromulina apheles together with a reconstruction of its flagellar apparatus (1986), and a chapter on the taxonomy of toxic haptophytes in the Manual on Harmful Marine Microalgae (2003).

=== Flagellar apparatus research ===
Moestrup began reconstructing the flagellar apparatus of several flagellates, including Chrysochromulina, Mamiella, Nephroselmis, Pyramimonas, Pseudoscourfieldia and Bicosoeca. This work was published as a complete issue of Phycologia and was accepted as his doctoral thesis at the University of Copenhagen, with the degree awarded in 1983. The thesis was published as a review in Phycologia, Flagellar structure in algae, with new observations on the Chrysophyceae, Phaeophyceae, Euglenophyceae and Reckertia. Studies of flagellar apparatus structure are used in discussions of the taxonomy and evolution of algal groups, and later work on flagellar structure in algae has cited Moestrup's reconstructions and review.

=== Dinoflagellate taxonomy and evolution ===
Later in his career Moestrup concentrated on the ultrastructure and evolution of dinoflagellates. His use of molecular methods began with PhD student Niels Daugbjerg, who worked on the phylogeny of prasinophytes, and the methods were later applied together with ultrastructural studies to many dinoflagellates, notably in a revision of the genera Gymnodinium and Gyrodinium.

In 2000 Daugbjerg, Gert Hansen, Jacob Larsen and Moestrup published a study in Phycologia that combined ultrastructure, including details of the flagellar apparatus, with partial large-subunit (LSU) ribosomal DNA sequences from a number of phototrophic and heterotrophic dinoflagellates. The authors concluded that the path of the apical groove is of particular importance in the taxonomy of the unarmoured (naked) genera, and that features then used to define many genera, such as the relative size of the epicone and hypocone, were misleading. Their results led to the splitting of Gymnodinium into four genera and to the establishment of three new genera of unarmoured dinoflagellates, Akashiwo, Karenia and Karlodinium. According to the authors, the fish-killing species they considered were confined to Karenia and Karlodinium, while the species Gymnodinium catenatum, which produces paralytic shellfish toxins, remained in Gymnodinium. The genus Gyrodinium was redefined. Later work on unarmoured dinoflagellates has used the fine-structural criteria proposed in the study as the basis for further genera, including Paragymnodinium and Takayama.

With António Calado and colleagues, Moestrup also worked on freshwater dinoflagellates; in 2009 they described Tyrannodinium, a freshwater genus closely related to the marine Pfiesteria-like species. In 2018 Moestrup and Calado published Freshwater Flora of Central Europe, Volume 6: Dinophyceae with Springer Spektrum, as volume 6 of the series Süßwasserflora von Mitteleuropa. The volume covers the freshwater dinoflagellates of the world, comprising 350 species, and provides keys, descriptions and illustrations for identifying the described species. According to the publisher, it describes seven new species and one new variety and proposes new orders, families and genera; it also includes chapters on ecology by Karin Rengefors and Anke Kremp and on culturing by Gert Hansen. Springer's description of the book states that four new names and 80 new combinations are established, while the ResearchGate record of the book states five new names and 79 new combinations.

=== Harmful algae and marine research ===
A mussel-poisoning event in the Faroe Islands in 1982 increased Moestrup's interest in the ultrastructure of the dinoflagellate Alexandrium tamarense isolated from the Limfjord in Denmark, and studies of other toxic and nontoxic dinoflagellates followed with his former PhD student Gert Hansen. In 1987 and 1988, during his sabbatical in Melbourne, he found a bloom of Alexandrium catenella in Port Phillip Bay. A detailed study of the toxic diatom Nitzschia navis-varingica with PhD student Nina Lundholm, described in 2000 as another producer of the neurotoxin domoic acid, led Moestrup to recognise the need for high-resolution scanning electron microscopy facilities.

According to ISSHA, Moestrup spent two years seeking funding for the IOC Science and Communication Centre on Harmful Algae, which opened in Copenhagen in 1995. The Intergovernmental Oceanographic Commission (IOC) of UNESCO reported in 2009 that the centre was hosted by the university's Department of Biology with Moestrup as its focal point at the university, was staffed by Henrik Enevoldsen and Jacob Larsen, and was concerned mainly with capacity building in the identification of harmful algae, including IOC training courses in the identification of harmful marine microalgae. The same report lists Moestrup as chair of the IOC panel's task team on algal taxonomy. He is the first-named editor of the IOC-UNESCO Taxonomic Reference List of Harmful Micro Algae, a catalogue of toxic microalgal species that aims to promote stability in their nomenclature and is maintained by an editorial committee of nine. These activities were collective efforts of the IOC, the centre's staff and other researchers.

In 1989 Moestrup and Larsen published Guide to Toxic and Potentially Toxic Marine Algae, a 61-page work issued in Copenhagen by the Fish Inspection Service of the Danish Ministry of Fisheries.

In 2014 Moestrup and colleagues, including Gert Hansen, Niels Daugbjerg, Nina Lundholm and António Calado, reported in the journal Harmful Algae on two fish kills in recirculation aquaculture systems in northern Jutland. The first, in December 2011, affected pikeperch in a brackish-water farm at Ejsing Seafarm, near Vinderup, and was attributed to the dinoflagellate Pfiesteria shumwayae; mortality in one raceway was estimated at about 20 tonnes of fish. The second, in mid-2012 at an experimental marine facility at the North Sea Science Park in Hirtshals, affected rainbow trout and was attributed to Luciella masanensis; the facility was eventually closed. The authors identified the organisms by sequencing LSU rDNA, confirmed by scanning electron microscopy and fluorescence microscopy of the thecal plates, and reported that no other harmful algae were present in either plant. They described the cases as apparently the first serious fish kills reported from recirculation aquaculture, and the first report of L. masanensis as a cause of fish kills.

The authors' conclusion rested on the identification of the dinoflagellates, the absence of other harmful organisms, and the observation that fish improved when the dinoflagellates were immobilised by chemical treatment and deteriorated again when the cells resumed swimming. At concentrations of two to three million cells per litre of P. shumwayae, fish kills were observed. The authors reported no new information on toxin production by either species, noted that earlier claims about toxins in fish kills attributed to Pfiesteria in the United States had been disputed, and observed that in laboratory trials the cells showed no interest in fish tissue but fed on organic material such as damaged nematodes. They suggested that high organic content in recirculating water favours these dinoflagellates. In their chapter on toxic freshwater dinoflagellates in the 2018 flora, Moestrup and Calado noted that few harmful freshwater dinoflagellates have been reported and that Naiadinium polonicum is the only species known to cause fish mortality.

== Selected publications ==
- Moestrup, Ø. (1979). "Identification by electron microscopy of marine nanoplankton from New Zealand, including the description of four new species". New Zealand Journal of Botany. 17: 61–95.
- Moestrup, Ø. (1982). "Flagellar structure in algae: a review, with new observations particularly on the Chrysophyceae, Phaeophyceae (Fucophyceae), Euglenophyceae, and Reckertia". Phycologia. 21 (4): 427–528.
- Vesk, M.; Moestrup, Ø. (1987). "The flagellar root system in Heterosigma akashiwo (Raphidophyceae)". Protoplasma. 137: 15–28.
- Larsen, J.; Moestrup, Ø. (1989). Guide to Toxic and Potentially Toxic Marine Algae. Copenhagen: The Fish Inspection Service, Ministry of Fisheries.
- Daugbjerg, N.; Hansen, G.; Larsen, J.; Moestrup, Ø. (2000). "Phylogeny of some of the major genera of dinoflagellates based on ultrastructure and partial LSU rDNA sequence data, including the erection of three new genera of unarmoured dinoflagellates". Phycologia. 39 (4): 302–317.
- Lundholm, N.; Moestrup, Ø. (2000). "Morphology of the marine diatom Nitzschia navis-varingica, sp. nov. (Bacillariophyceae), another producer of the neurotoxin domoic acid". Journal of Phycology. 36: 1162–1174.
- Moestrup, Ø.; Thomsen, H. A. (2003). "Taxonomy of toxic haptophytes (prymnesiophytes)". In Hallegraeff, G. M.; Anderson, D. M.; Cembella, A. D. (eds.). Manual on Harmful Marine Microalgae. Paris: UNESCO Publishing. pp. 433–463.
- Moestrup, Ø.; Hansen, G.; Daugbjerg, N.; Lundholm, N.; Overton, J.; Vestergård, M.; Steenfeldt, S. J.; Calado, A. J.; Hansen, P. J. (2014). "The dinoflagellates Pfiesteria shumwayae and Luciella masanensis cause fish kills in recirculation fish farms in Denmark". Harmful Algae. 32: 33–39.
- Moestrup, Ø.; Calado, A. J. (2018). Süßwasserflora von Mitteleuropa, Bd. 6 - Freshwater Flora of Central Europe, Vol. 6: Dinophyceae. Berlin and Heidelberg: Springer Spektrum.

== Honours and recognition ==
In 2012 Professor Moestrup received the Yasumoto Award for excellence in his lifetime dedicated work of research on the biology, taxonomy and ultrastructure of microalgae. The award citation also recognised his contribution, through the IOC Science and Communication Centre on Harmful Algae in Copenhagen and the IOC Reference List of Harmful Microalgae, to training and communication on the taxonomy of harmful algal bloom species. He was elected to the Royal Danish Academy of Sciences and Letters in 1992; the academy lists him in its natural sciences class, in the field of botany with particular reference to algae. In 2006 Queen Margrethe II of Denmark awarded him the Order of the Dannebrog for his work at the University of Copenhagen. He is an honorary member of the International Phycological Society and of the International Society for Eukaryotic Microbiology.

The following have been named after him:

- Gyrodinium moestrupii
- Moestrupia, a genus of marine dinoflagellates described in 2011
- Ochromonas moestrupii
- Platychrysis moestrupii
- Pyramimonas moestrupii
- Resultomonas moestrupii

ISSHA also lists Hafniomonas heom, whose species name combines the initials of Hans Ettl and Øjvind Moestrup.

The standard author abbreviation Moestrup is used to indicate this person as the author when citing a botanical name.
