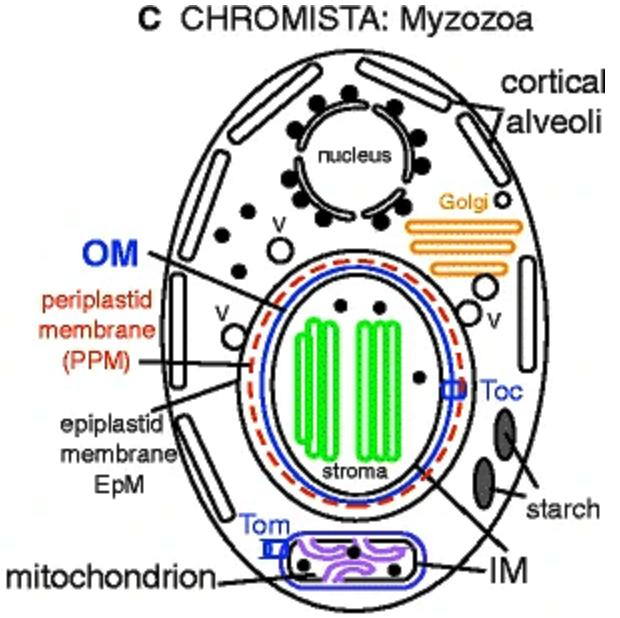
- Myzozoa membrane structure

Scientific classification
- Domain: Eukaryota
- Clade: Sar
- Clade: Alveolata
- Clade: Myzozoa; Cavalier-Smith & Chao 2004

Phyla
- Apicomplexa; Chromerida; Dinozoa; Dinoflagellata; Perkinsozoa

= Myzozoa =

Group of single-celled organisms

Myzozoa is a grouping of specific phyla within Alveolata, that either feed through myzocytosis, or were ancestrally capable of feeding through myzocytosis.

It is sometimes described as a phylum, containing the major subphyla Dinozoa and Apicomplexa, plus minor subphyla.

The term Myzozoa superseded the previous term Miozoa, by the same authority, and gave a slightly altered meaning.

== Phyla ==
Within Myzozoa, there are four phyla:

- Apicomplexa – parasitic protozoa that lack axonemal locomotive structures except in gametes
- Dinoflagellata – mostly marine flagellates many of which have chloroplasts
- Chromerida – a marine phylum of photosynthetic protozoa
- Perkinsozoa

The phylogenetic relationship between the four phyla and closely related class Squirmid are as follows:

- Myzozoa
  - Dinozoa
    - Dinoflagellata
    - Perkinsozoa
  - ACS
    - Squirmid
    - - Chromerida
      - Apicomplexa

== Evolution ==
The most closely related large clade to the myzozoans are the ciliates. Both of these groups of organisms – unlike the majority of eukaryotes studied to date – seem to have a linear mitochondrial genome. Most other eukaryotes that have had their mitochondrial genomes examined have circular genomes. However, the taxonomic term Myzozoa specifically excludes ciliates which are rather under the higher taxonomic rank Alveolata. Thus, Alveoata includes two large groups: Myzozoa and Ciliophora plus the smaller groups discussed above.

All Myzozoa appears to have evolved from an ancestor that possessed plastids, required through endosymbiosis.

The branching order within both Myzozoa and Protalveolata, is only partly understood. Three groups – the colpodellids, Chromerida and the Apicomplexa – appear to be sister clades. Three other groups – the perkinsids, Syndiniales and Oxyrrhis are distantly related to the dinoflagellates.

== Notes ==
Perkinsus marinus and the Apicomplexa both have histones while the dinoflagellates appear to have lost theirs.

Chromerida are ancestrally myzocytotic, on the basis of evidence for myzocytosis by the chromerid Vitrella brassicaformis.
