= Myzocytosis =

Method of feeding in some heterotrophic organisms

Myzocytosis (from Greek: myzein, (μυζεῖν) meaning "to suck" and kytos (κύτος) meaning "container", hence referring to "cell") is a specialized form of endocytosis found in some heterotrophic organisms. It is the process by which a predatory cell pierces the cell wall and/or cell membrane of a prey cell, using a feeding tube (the conoid), to suck out and digest the cellular contents. This particular class of endocytosis is restricted to parasites that feed on single cells.

== History ==
The discovery of myzocytosis as its own process apart from phagocytosis, revealed that parasitic protists were able to feed on the contents of cells without engulfing them, leaving behind parts of the host cytoplasm. Evidence of myzocytosis has been present in the fossil record for about 750 million years as perforations in the protective shells of other protists, and is thought to have evolved as a feeding strategy for eukaryotes. Predatory feeding by protists likely imposed selective pressure that contributed to the independent origins of multicellularity, as increases in prey size may have facilitated the evolution of myzocytosis in these predatory protists. Electron microscopical Investigations by E. Schnepf and G. Deichgraber provided the first observations of myzocytosis in Paulsenella, a parasitic dinophyte preying on Streptotheca thamesis.

== Mechanism of Feeding ==
Investigations into Paulsenella revealed that a cytoplasmic feeding tube (conoid) is punctured through the diatom cell wall (frustule) and into the interior of the cell. A food vacuole is then established through the formation of a channel within the host cell membrane, originating from the puncture and enlarging to variable diameters. Structure of the feeding tube is maintained through its cytoskeletal elements, as it is reinforced with rows of microtubules for stability and flexibility.

Movement of the host is restricted during the feeding process due to the host cell membrane attaching to the outer membrane of the conoid. This allows for the long-lasting process in which the host cytoplasm is sucked up through the tube and extracted as nutrients for the parasite.

== Organisms ==
Myzocytosis is found in Myzozoa and also in some species of Ciliophora (both comprise the alveolates). An example of myzocytosis is the feeding method of the infamous predatory ciliate, Didinium, where it is often depicted devouring a Paramecium. The suctorian ciliates were originally thought to have fed exclusively through myzocytosis, sucking out the cytoplasm of prey via superficially drinking straw-like pseudopodia. It is now understood that suctorians do not feed through myzocytosis, but actually, instead, manipulate and envenomate captured prey with their tentacle-like pseudopodia.

Myzocytosis occurs with both dinoflagellates and euglenozoans. The feeding of Myzozoa allows for uptake of necessary nutrients such as carbon and nitrogen. Myzocytosis is sequential and is hypothesized to involve signal transduction, where enzymes and molecules are released to breach the membrane of its prey. During myzocytosis in some dinoflagellates, the cell's "food vacuole" enlarges and can form a temporary cyst after feeding. Actin is hypothesized to support the formation of the "tubular tether" during myzocytosis.
