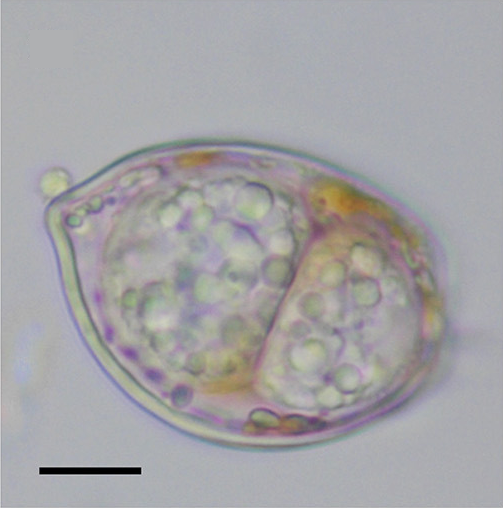
- Double infection of two late Dinovorax pyriformis trophonts in a Prorocentrum micans cell. Scale bar: 10 μm.

Scientific classification
- Domain: Eukaryota
- Clade: Sar
- Clade: Alveolata
- Clade: Dinozoa
- Phylum: Perkinsozoa; Norén & Moestrup 1999
- Class: Perkinsea; Levine 1978

Clades
- Perkinsidae; Pararosariidae; Parviluciferaceae; Xcellidae; Maranthos; Acrocoelus?; Rastrimonas?

Synonyms
- Perkinsasida; Perkinsorida; Perkinsemorphina

= Perkinsea =

Group of intracellular parasites

Perkinsids are single-celled protists that live as intracellular parasites of a variety of other organisms. They are classified as the class Perkinsea within the monotypic phylum Perkinsozoa. It is part of the eukaryotic supergroup Alveolata, along with dinoflagellates, their closest relatives, and another parasitic group known as Apicomplexa. Perkinsids are found in aquatic environments, as parasites of dinoflagellates and various animals.

== Description ==
All known Perkinsozoa are intracellular parasites of a range of organisms, particularly microalgae and animals. Species of Parviluciferaceae, Pararosariidae and Maranthos are parasites of dinoflagellates. Rastrimonas parasitize cryptophyte algae. Xcellidae, Perkinsidae and Acrocoelus are parasites of various animals: fish, bivalve molluscs and acorn worms, respectively. Perkinsozoa are found in aquatic environments, both marine and freshwater.

== Systematics ==
=== Taxonomic history ===
Perkinsids were first described by Norman D. Levine in 1978, as the class Perkinsea within Alveolata. Levine only included one genus, Perkinsus, described in the same publication. Later, the same author treated this group as class Perkinsasida within the phylum Apicomplexa, suggesting that Perkinsus is the most primitive apicomplexan. However, this placement was controversial, and was later disproven by phylogenetic analyses that proved more evolutionary proximity to dinoflagellates than to apicomplexans.

In 1999, with the discovery of Parvilucifera, biologists Fredrik Norén and Øjvind Moestrup separated the class Perkinsea into a new phylum Perkinsozoa, within the Alveolata, to accommodate these two genera. In 2002 a third genus was described, Cryptophagus (now renamed Rastrimonas), but it was never genetically sequenced, which makes its phylogenetic position uncertain.

In 2014 a new class was added to the phylum, known as Squirmidea. However, phylogenetic analyses later demonstrated that squirmids are more closely related to the clade uniting Apicomplexa and Colpodellida than to dinoflagellates and perkinsids, and its status as a class of Perkinsozoa was rejected, making Perkinsea the only remaining class.

=== Phylogeny ===
- - - Myzozoa
      - - - Apicomplexa
          - Chromerida
        - Squirmida
      - Dinozoa
        - Perkinsozoa
        - Dinoflagellata
  - Ciliophora
- Colponemida

Simplified cladogram of Alveolata based on 2023 phylogenomic analyses.

Perkinsids are a monophyletic group (or clade) of Alveolata, a large group of ecologically diverse protists such as dinoflagellates, ciliates, apicomplexans and chrompodellids, all characterized by the presence of cortical alveoli below their cell membrane. In particular, perkinsids are the sister group of dinoflagellates, together forming a clade known as Dinozoa. Both groups, along with apicomplexans and their closest relatives, compose a clade known as Myzozoa.

=== Classification ===
As of 2023, the order-level classification of perkinsids remains ambiguous, and orders are very sparsely used. The families Pararosariidae and Parviluciferaceae have no assigned parent order, although one author, Thomas Cavalier-Smith, previously placed Parvilucifera within the order Rastrimonadida, along with Rastrimonas. This has not been supported by any other author, and both Rastrimonadida and Rastrimonas are omitted from current classifications for lacking molecular data. Similarly, the genus Acrocoelus, assigned directly to the order Acrocoelida without a family, is also excluded due to the absence of molecular data. The genus Maranthos, although genetically sequenced, is not assigned to any family or order. The remaining groups, Perkinsidae and Xcellidae, are only sometimes assigned to order Perkinsida, while in other instances their parent taxon is directly Perkinsea. Taxonomic ranks (i.e. families, orders, classes...) are mostly omitted in favour of using only clades. Shown below is the commonly accepted scheme, omitting order-level taxa:

- - - - - 'NAG01' clade
        - Maranthos
      - - Pararosariidae
          Pararosarium
    - - Xcellidae
        - - Xcellia
          - Notoxcellia
        - - - Gadixcellia
            - Salmoxcellia
          - Cryoxcellia
      - Perkinsidae
        Perkinsus
  - - Parviluciferaceae
      - - - Parvilucifera
          - Snorkelia
        - Dinovorax
      - Tuberlatum

Simplified cladogram of Perkinsea based on 2021-2023 phylogenetic analyses. Environmental DNA clades are omitted, with the exception of clade 'NAG01' which groups possible infectious agents of tadpoles.

- Maranthos Alacid & Reñé 2021
- Family Pararosariidae Jeon & Park 2021
  - Pararosarium Jeon & Park 2021
- Family Parviluciferaceae Reñé & Alacid 2017
  - Dinovorax Reñé & Alacid 2017
  - Parvilucifera Norén & Moestrup 1999
  - Snorkelia Reñé & Alacid 2017
  - Tuberlatum Jeon & Park 2019
- Family Perkinsidae Levine 1978
  - Perkinsus Levine 1978
- Family Xcellidae Freeman et al. 2017 em. Karlsbakk, Nystøyl, Plarre & Nylund 2021
  - Cryoxcellia Evans, Patel, Matzke & Millar 2023
  - Gadixcellia Freeman et al. 2017
  - Notoxcellia Desvignes et al. 2022
  - Salmoxcellia Karlsbakk, Nystøyl, Plarre & Nylund 2021
  - Xcellia Freeman et al. 2017

As mentioned above, two genera have uncertain placement because they have never been genetically sequenced, but they have been assigned to Perkinsea on the basis of their morphology:

- Rastrimonas Brugerolle 2003
- Acrocoelus Fernández, Pardos, Benito & Arroyo 1999
