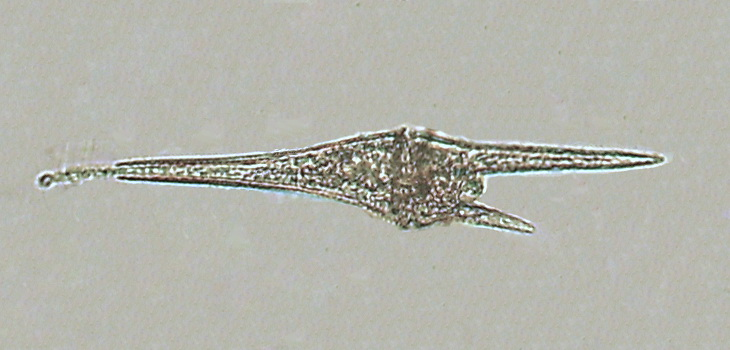
- Ceratium furca

Scientific classification
- Domain: Eukaryota
- Clade: Sar
- Clade: Halvaria
- Clade: Alveolata; Cavalier-Smith 1991

Subgroups
- Ciliophora; Myzozoa; ACS; Apicomplexa; Colpodellida; Squirmida; Dinozoa; Dinoflagellata; Perkinsea; Colponema; Acavomonas; Palustrimonas; Neocolponema; Loeffela

Synonyms
- Alveolatobiontes

= Alveolate =

Alveolate Temporal range: Ediacaran–Recent

Clade of protists

The alveolates are a group of protists, considered a major clade within Eukaryota. They are currently grouped with the Stramenopiles and Rhizaria among the protists with tubulocristate mitochondria into the SAR supergroup. It is ranked as a superphylum in Ruggiero et al., 2015.

== Characteristics ==
The most notable shared characteristic is the presence of cortical (near the surface) alveoli (sacs). These are flattened vesicles (sacs) arranged as a layer just under the membrane and supporting it, typically contributing to a flexible pellicle (thin skin). In armored dinoflagellates they may contain stiff plates. Alveolates have mitochondria with tubular cristae (invaginations), and cells often have pore-like intrusions through the cell surface. The group contains free-living and parasitic organisms, predatory flagellates, and photosynthetic organisms.

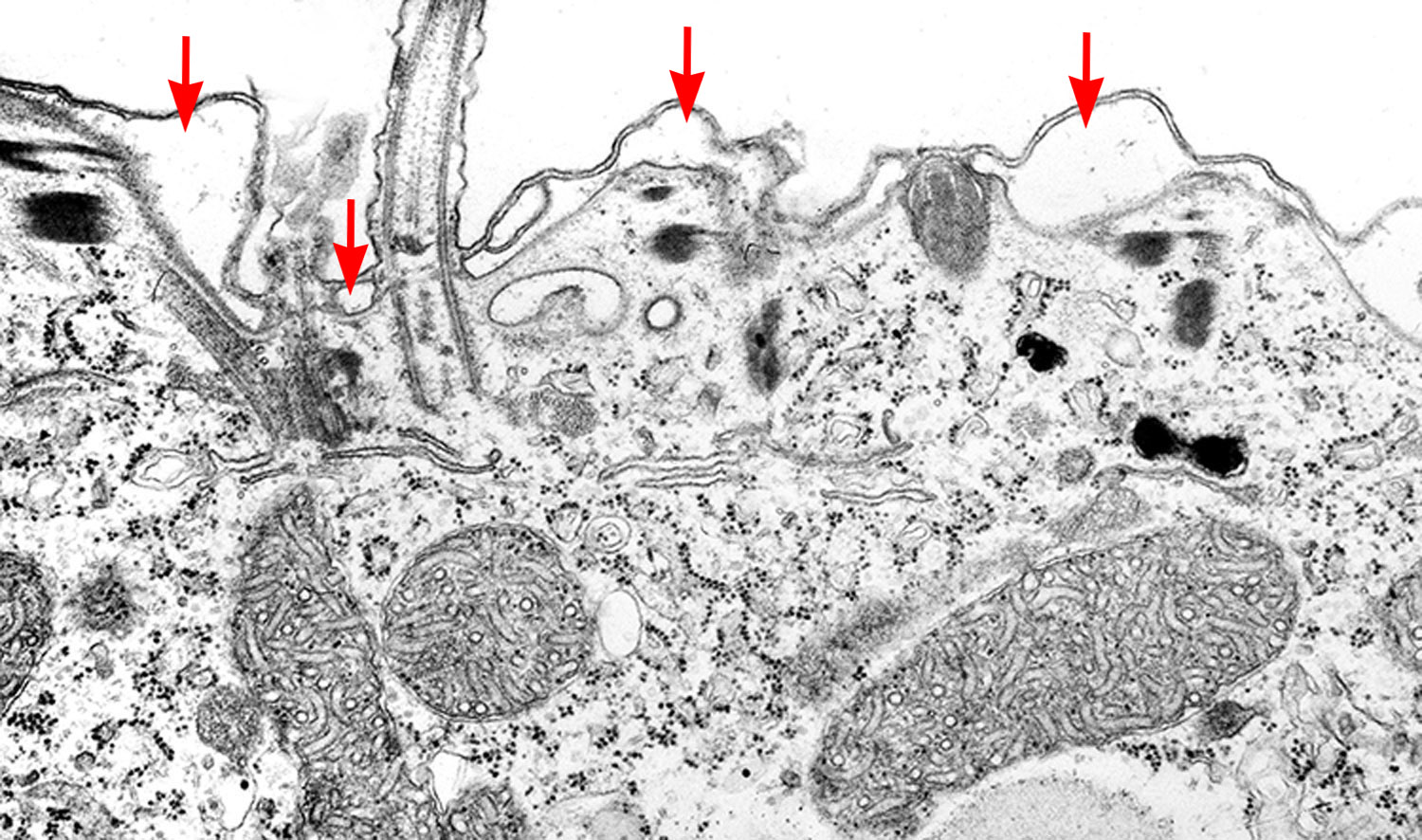
Transmission electron micrograph of a thin section of the surface of the ciliate Paramecium putrinum, showing the alveoli (red arrows) under the cell surface

Almost all sequenced mitochondrial genomes of ciliates and apicomplexa are linear. The mitochondria almost all carry mtDNA of their own but with greatly reduced genome sizes. Exceptions are Cryptosporidium which are left with only a mitosome, the circular mitochondrial genomes of Acavomonas and Babesia microti, and Toxoplasma's highly fragmented mitochondrial genome, consisting of 21 sequence blocks which recombine to produce longer segments.

== History ==
The relationship of apicomplexa, dinoflagellates and ciliates had been suggested during the 1980s, and this was confirmed in the early 1990s by comparisons of ribosomal RNA sequences, most notably by Gajadhar et al. Cavalier-Smith introduced the formal name Alveolata in 1991, although at the time he considered the grouping to be a paraphyletic assemblage. Many biologists prefer the use of the colloquial name 'alveolate'.

== Classification ==
Alveolata include around six major groups. They are diverse in form, and are known to be related by various ultrastructural and genetic similarities:

- Ciliophora – very common protozoa with many short cilia arranged in rows, and two nuclei
- Dinoflagellata s.l. – mostly marine flagellates many of which have chloroplasts
- Perkinsea
- Colpodellida – a marine group of photosynthetic protozoa
- Apicomplexa – parasitic and secondary non-photosynthetic protozoa that lack axonemal locomotive structures except in gametes
- Squirmida

The Acavomonidia and Colponemidia were previously grouped together as colponemids, a taxon now split because each has a distinctive organization or ultrastructural identity. The Acavomonidia are closer to the dinoflagellate/perkinsid group than the Colponemidia are. As such, the informal term "colponemids", as it stands currently, covers two non-sister groups within Alveolata: the Acavomonidia and the Colponemidia. As of present, five genera of colponemids are recognized.

The Apicomplexa and dinoflagellates may be more closely related to each other than to the ciliates. Both have plastids, and most share a bundle or cone of microtubules at the top of the cell. In apicomplexans this forms part of a complex used to enter host cells, while in some colorless dinoflagellates it forms a peduncle used to ingest prey. Various other genera are closely related to these two groups, mostly flagellates with a similar apical structure. These include free-living members in Oxyrrhis and Colponema, and parasites in Perkinsus, Parvilucifera, Rastrimonas and the ellobiopsids. In 2001, direct amplification of the rRNA gene in marine picoplankton samples revealed the presence of two novel alveolate lineages, called group I and II. Group I has no cultivated relatives, while group II is related to the dinoflagellate parasite Amoebophrya, which was classified until now in the Syndiniales dinoflagellate order.

Some studies suggested the haplosporids, mostly parasites of marine invertebrates, might belong here, but they lack alveoli and are now placed among the Cercozoa.

The ellobiopsids are of uncertain relation within the alveolates. Silberman et al 2004 establish that the Thalassomyces genus of ellobiopsids are alveolates using phylogenetic analysis, however as of 2016 no more certainty exists on their place.

=== Phylogeny ===
In 2018, Thomas Cavalier-Smith described the phylogeny of the Alveolata as follows:

- Alveolata
  - Ciliophora
    - Intramacronucleata
      - Heterotrichea
      - Karyorelictea
    - Postciliodesmatophora
      - Desmata
      - Spirotrichia
  - Miozoa
    - Colponemea
    - - Acavomonadea
      - Myzozoa
        - Apicomplexa
          - Apicomonada (equivalent of Colpodellida of Adl et al, 2019)
          - Sporozoa (equivalent of Apicomplexa of others, e.g. Adl et al, 2019)
        - Dinozoa
          - Dinoflagellata
          - Perkinsea

== Development ==
The development of plastids among the alveolates is intriguing. Cavalier-Smith proposed the alveolates developed from a chloroplast-containing ancestor, which also gave rise to the Chromista (the chromalveolate hypothesis). Other researchers have speculated that the alveolates originally lacked plastids and possibly the dinoflagellates and Apicomplexa acquired them separately. However, it now appears that the alveolates, the dinoflagellates, the Colpodellida and the heterokont algae acquired their plastids from a red alga with evidence of a common origin of this organelle in all these four clades.

== Evolution ==
A Bayesian estimate places the evolution of the alveolate group at ~850 million years ago. The Alveolata consist of Myzozoa, ciliates, and colponemids. In other words, the term Myzozoa, meaning "to siphon the contents from prey", may be applied informally to the common ancestor of the subset of alveolates that are neither ciliates nor colponemids. Predation upon algae is an important driver in alveolate evolution, as it can provide sources for endosymbiosis of novel plastids. The term Myzozoa is therefore a handy concept for tracking the history of the alveolate group.

The ancestors of the alveolate group may have been photosynthetic. The ancestral alveolate probably possessed a plastid. Chromerids, apicomplexans, and peridinin dinoflagellates have retained this organelle. Going one step even further back, the chromerids, the peridinin dinoflagellates and the heterokont algae have been argued to possess a monophyletic plastid lineage in common, i.e. acquired their plastids from a red alga, and so it seems likely that the common ancestor of alveolates and heterokonts was also photosynthetic.

In one school of thought the common ancestor of the dinoflagellates, apicomplexans, Colpodella, Colpodellida, and Voromonas was a myzocytotic predator with two heterodynamic flagella, micropores, trichocysts, rhoptries, micronemes, a polar ring and a coiled open sided conoid. While the common ancestor of alveolates may also have possessed some of these characteristics, it has been argued that Myzocytosis was not one of these characteristics, as ciliates ingest prey by a different mechanism.

An ongoing debate concerns the number of membranes surrounding the plastid across apicomplexans and certain dinoflagellates, and the origin of these membranes. This ultrastructural character can be used to group organisms and if the character is in common, it can imply that phyla had a common photosynthetic ancestor. On the basis that apicomplexans possess a plastid surrounded by four membranes, and that peridinin dinoflagellates possess a plastid surrounded by three membranes, Petersen et al. have been unable to rule out that the shared stramenopile-alveolate plastid could have been recycled multiple times in the alveolate phylum, the source being stramenopile-alveolate donors, through the mechanism of ingestion and endosymbiosis.

Ciliates are a model alveolate, having been genetically studied in great depth over the longest period of any alveolate lineage. They are unusual among eukaryotes in that reproduction involves a micronucleus and a macronucleus. Their reproduction is easily studied in the lab, and made them a model eukaryote historically. Being entirely predatory and lacking any remnant plastid, their development as a phylum illustrates how predation and autotrophy are in dynamic balance and that the balance can swing one way or other at the point of origin of a new phylum from mixotrophic ancestors, causing one ability to be lost.

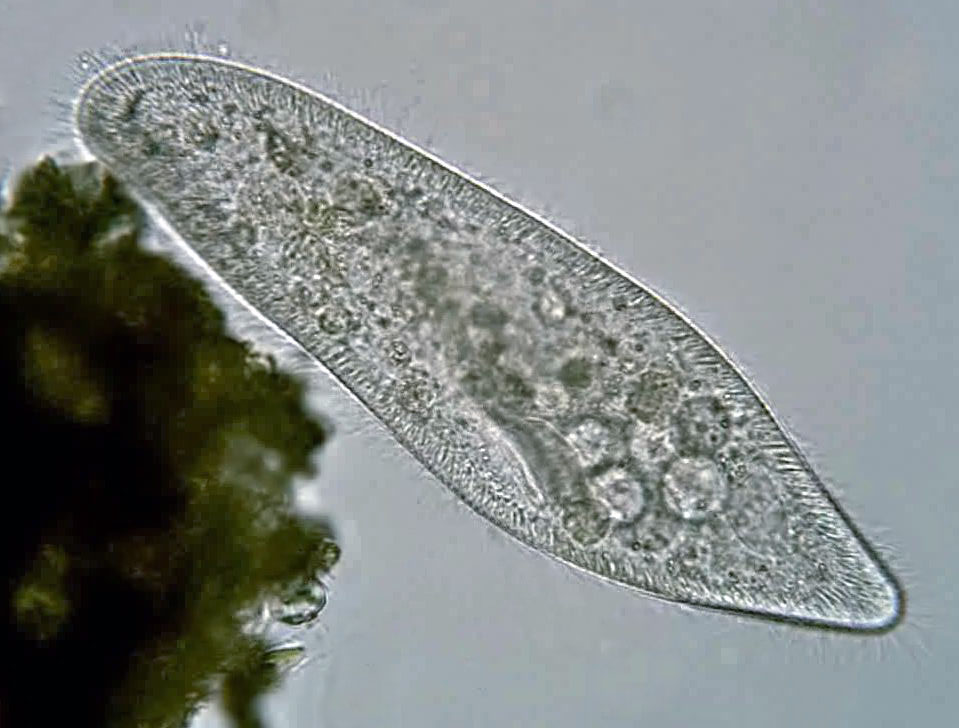
Paramecium caudatum (Ciliophora)

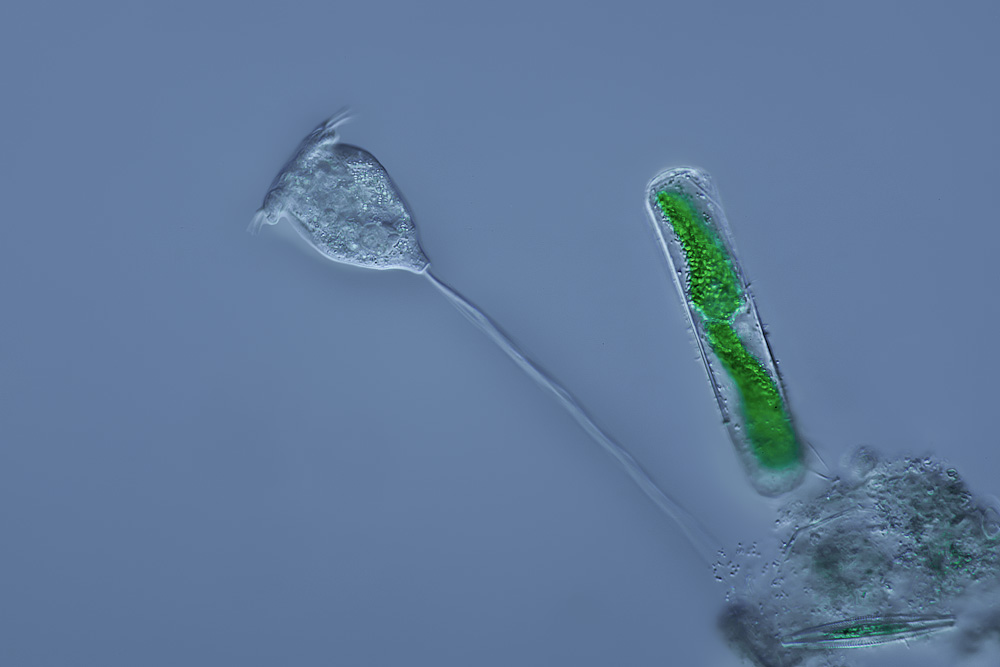
Vorticella (Ciliophora) (left)

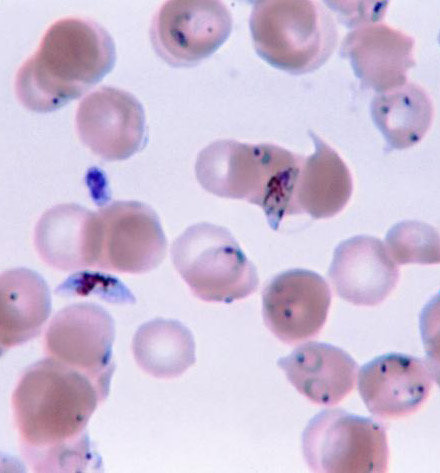
Plasmodium falciparum (Apicomplexa) in blood

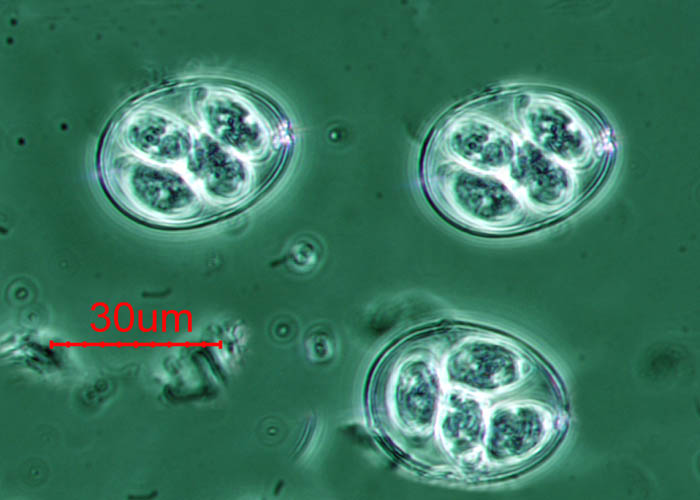
Eimeria maxima (Apicomplexa)

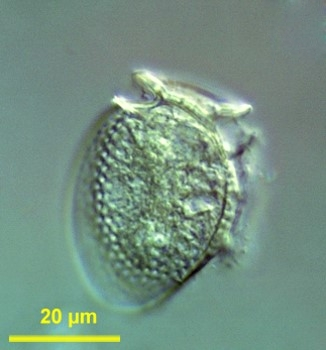
Dinophysis acuminata (Dinoflagellata)

== Epigenetics ==
Few algae have been studied for epigenetics. Those for which epigenetic data are available include some algal alveolates.
