= Microneme =

Secretory organelles

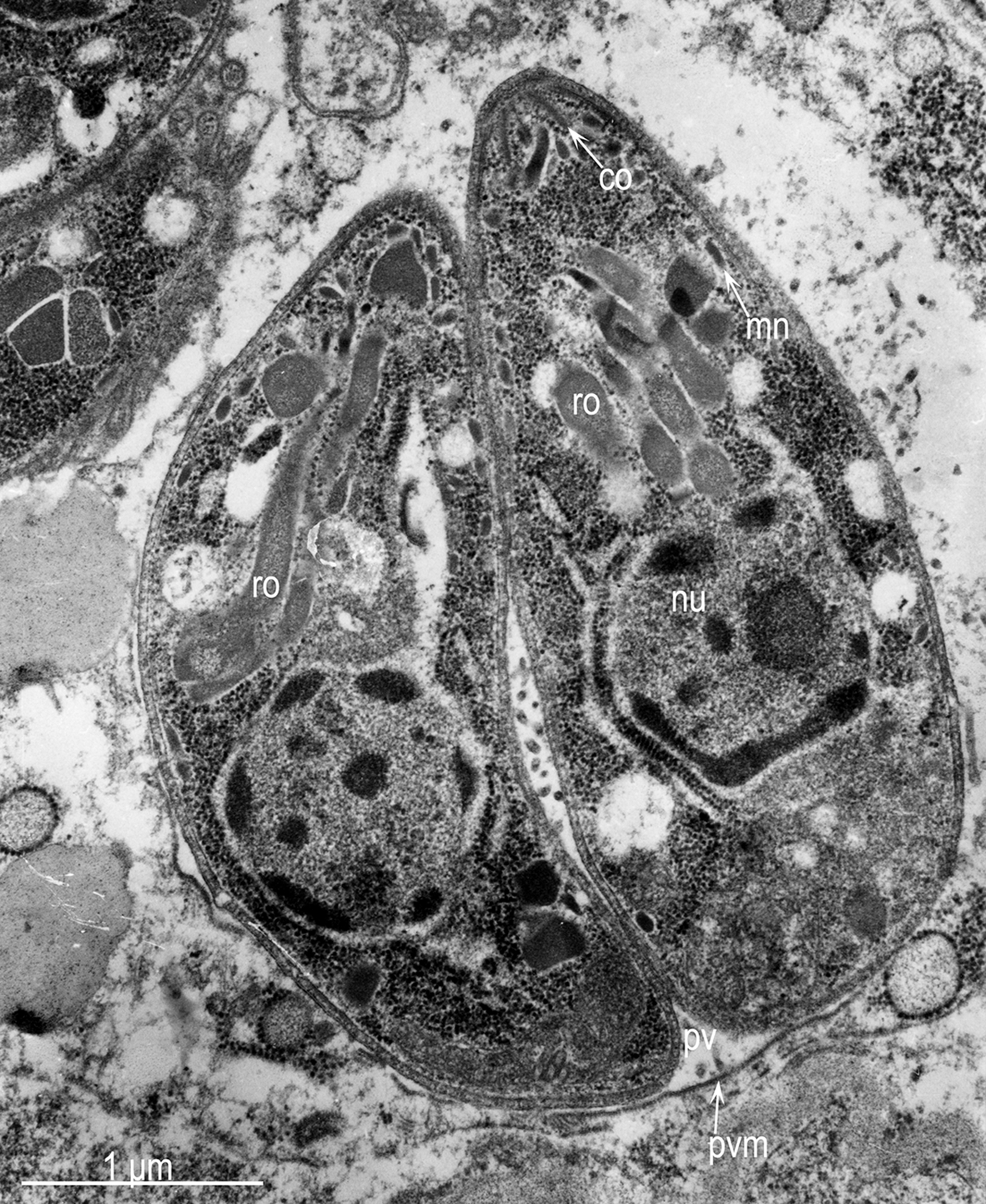
Tachyzoites of Toxoplasma gondii, transmission electron microscopy. Micronemes: mn (click to enlarge)

Micronemes are secretory organelles, possessed by parasitic apicomplexans. Micronemes are located on the apical third of the protozoan body. They are surrounded by a typical unit membrane. On electron microscopy they have an electron-dense matrix due to the high protein content. They are specialized secretory organelles important for host-cell invasion and gliding motility.

These organelles secrete several proteins such as the Plasmodium falciparum apical membrane antigen-1, or PfAMA1, and Erythrocyte family antigen, or EBA, family proteins. These proteins specialize in binding to erythrocyte surface receptors and facilitating erythrocyte entry. Only by this initial chemical exchange can the parasite enter into the erythrocyte via actin-myosin motor complex.

It has been posited that this organelle works cooperatively with its counterpart organelle, the rhoptry, which also is a secretory organelle. It is possible that, while the microneme initiates erythrocyte-binding, the rhoptry secretes proteins to create the PVM, or the parasitophorous vacuole membrane, in which the parasite can survive and reproduce.

== See also ==
- Dense granule
- Rhoptry
