= Maurer's cleft =

Structures seen in the red blood cell when infected with Plasmodium falciparum

Maurer's clefts are membranous structures seen in the red blood cell during infection with Plasmodium falciparum. The function and contents of Maurer's clefts are not completely known; however, they appear to play a role in trafficking of Plasmodium falciparum erythrocyte membrane protein 1 (PfEMP1) and other adhesins to the red blood cell surface.

== Description ==
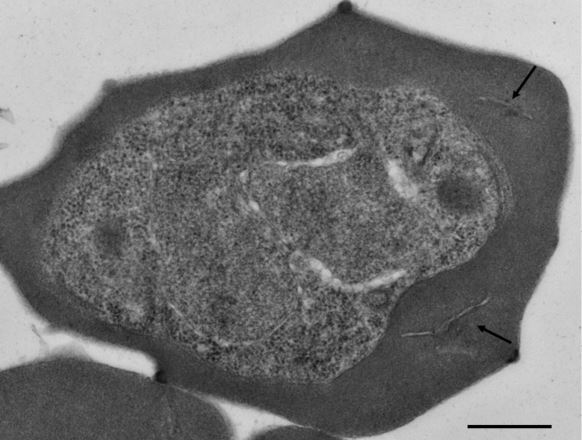
Transmission electron micrograph of red blood cell infected with P. falciparum. Maurer's clefts are marked with arrows. Scale bar is 500 nm.

Maurer's clefts appear in the cytosol of red blood cells 2 to 4 hours after invasion by P. falciparum. They originally appear as small membrane-bound vacuoles, likely originating from the parasitophorous vacuole membrane. However, as the parasite ages Maurer's clefts expand to form single flattened cisternae, 500-nanometers wide. In parasite strains lacking the protein REX1, Maurer's clefts instead appear as stacks of cisternae, similar to stacks of Golgi bodies.

For the first half of the parasite life cycle, Maurer's clefts are highly mobile in the host cytoplasm. However, as parasites transition to the trophozoite stage Maurer's clefts become fixed in place. This fixation coincides with PfEMP1 appearing on the host cell surface. The structures tethering Maurer's clefts to the host cell membrane are visible by transmission electron microscopy as cylindrical structures 200–300 nanometers long and 30 nanometers wide. The structure of these tethers is poorly defined, but they appear to contain the parasite protein MAHRP2 and/or involve host actin.

== Function ==
Maurer's clefts are thought to function as sorting centers, through which parasite proteins are trafficked on their way to the red blood cell surface. The most important of these are parasite proteins involved in binding of infected red blood cells to the host blood vessels, such as PfEMP1s, repetitive interspersed family proteins (RIFINs), and subtelomeric variant open reading frame proteins (STEVORs), all of which localize to the Maurer's clefts on their way to the red blood cell surface. A number of other parasite proteins involved in modifying the host cell also localize to the Maurer's clefts such as PfMC-2TMs, FIKK kinases, as well as some members of the Plasmodium helical interspersed subtelomeric (PHIST) family of parasite proteins.

== History ==
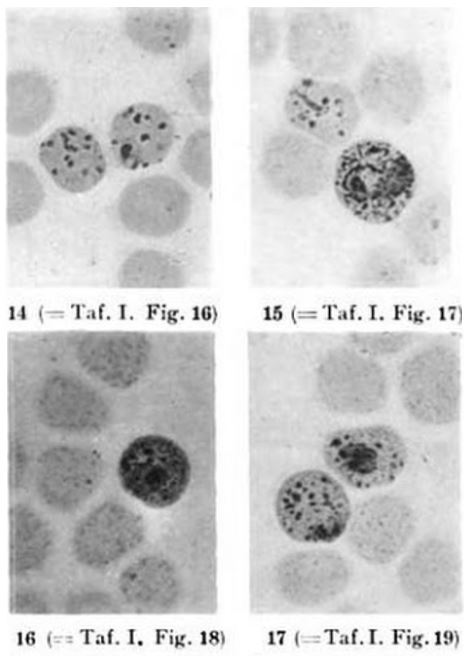
Images from original description of Maurer's clefts in 1902. Images show red blood cells infected with Plasmodium falciparum stained with alkaline methylene blue.

Georg Maurer first described the structures now known as Maurer's clefts in 1902, when he described methylene blue-stained spots in red blood cells containing older P. falciparum parasites. He proposed that these spots were due to injury of the host cell and consumption of host cell materials by the parasite. A more detailed description of Maurer's clefts using electron microscopy was published by William Trager, Maria Rudzinska, and Phyllis Bradbury in 1966.
