= African Malaria Network Trust =

Non-governmental organization

African Malaria Network Trust Acronym: AMANET
- Logo: African Malaria Network Trust
- Formation: 14 March 2002
- Type: International NGO
- Headquarters: Dar es Salaam, Tanzania
- Official language: English
- Managing Trustee: Prof. Wen Kilama
- Website: web.archive.org/web/20120114061553/http://www.amanet-trust.org/

The African Malaria Network Trust (AMANET) is a pan-African international NGO headquartered in Dar es Salaam, Tanzania. It originally started its activities as African Malaria Vaccine Testing Network (AMVTN) in 1995 with the primary goal of preparing Africa in planning and conducting malaria vaccine trials. In order to widen the scope in malaria interventions, AMVTN was succeeded by AMANET on 14 March 2002. Although the primary goal of AMANET has remained malaria vaccine development, the organization in its expanded role includes other intervention measures such as antimalaria drugs and vector control.

== Precedence ==
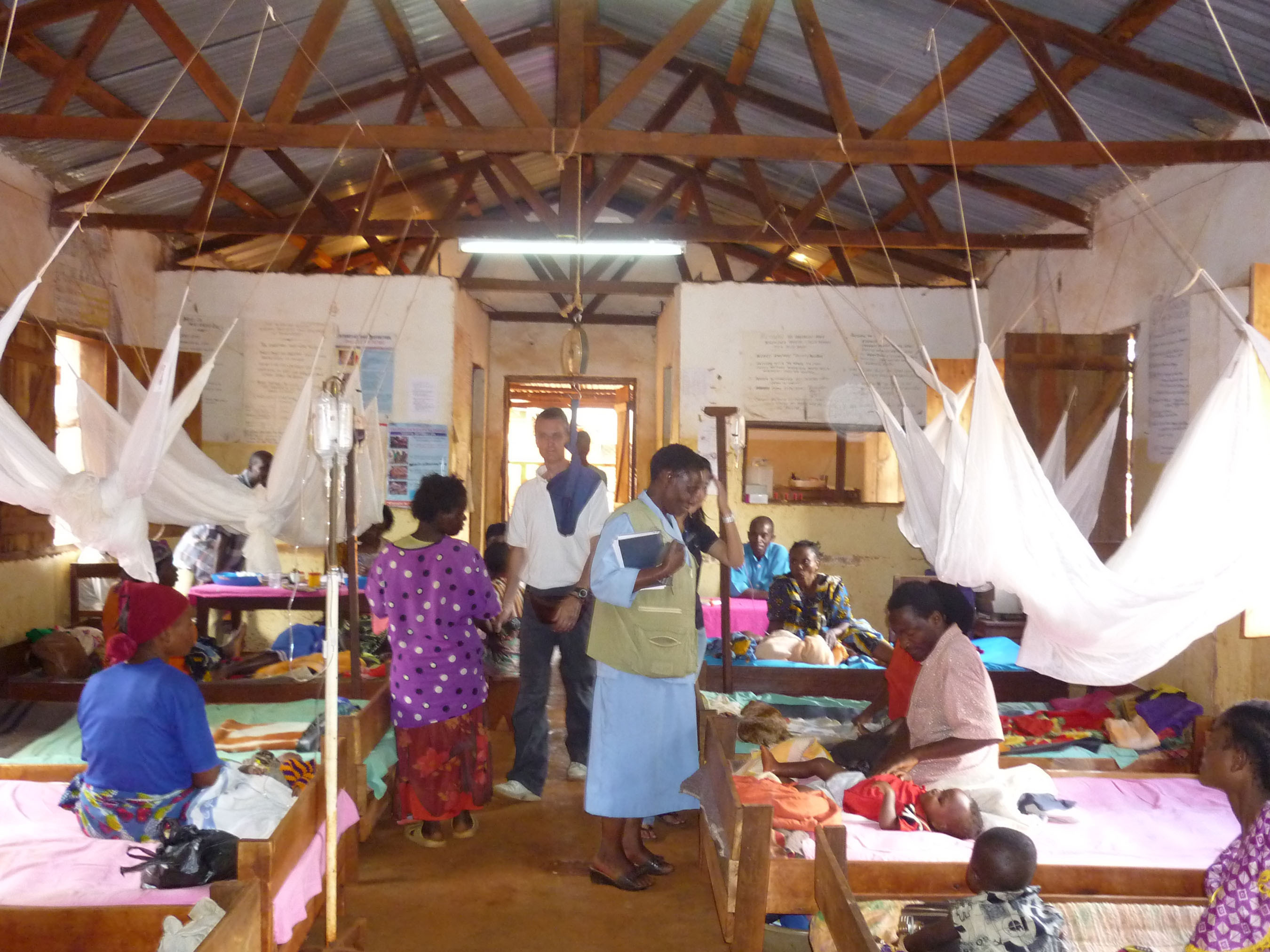
Malaria Clinic in Tanzania helped by SMS for Life program

Malaria is a preventable disease that afflicts hundreds of millions of people causing among them untoward socio-economic suffering including a vicious cycle of abject poverty, brain damage, other irreversible disabilities, and over one million deaths per year. Notwithstanding this leading disease burden, malaria has yet to get the status it deserves on the political and other relevant agenda of endemic communities and development partners.

For centuries, malaria has adversely affected the history of sub-Saharan Africa; its control during the past century however concentrated on urban areas where colonial authorities and traders lived and in agricultural estates and mines whose products sustained industries in the colonizing countries. When the global malaria eradication program was showing signs of success, which coincided with the wave of national independence, the eradication program was abandoned in Africa on the pretext of mainly administrative and financial constraints. However, the strategies were continued elsewhere. As a consequence, the malaria situation in Africa worsened; now Africa bears the brunt of the world malaria burden estimated at 500 million malaria cases and up to 3 million malaria deaths per annum, and costing an estimated US$12 billion annually.

Continued failure of current strategies (prompt diagnosis, early correct treatment, and the use of insecticide treated nets (ITNs) calls for a need to develop entirely new tools that would contribute to the fight of a resilient enemy and reverse its devastation. Over the last three decades there has been considerable interest in research and development of malaria vaccines. Research results that have been obtained so far show that malaria vaccine candidates would differ not only in their biological properties, but also in their eventual applications. Vaccines have been exceptionally effective against a number of diseases and have become one of the safest and most cost-effective weapons in medicine's arsenal against communicable disease. Perhaps no other intervention has had such a dramatic impact on the health and well-being of our society as the introduction of vaccines.

== Establishment ==
In 1995 at a conference held in Arusha, Tanzania, 81 malaria researchers from Africa, Europe and North America established the African Malaria Vaccine Testing Network (AMVTN) in order to prepare Africa for planning, undertaking and coordinating malaria vaccine trials In order to widen the scope in malaria interventions, and to operate within a legal framework, AMVTN was succeeded by AMANET in 2002. Although the primary goal of AMANET has remained malaria vaccine development, in its expanded role the organization would also support study into other intervention approaches such as antimalarial drugs, diagnostics and vector control. AMANET is committed to the creation of an environment for enabling the development of African centres of excellence in malaria research through capacity strengthening of African scientists and institutions.

== Mission ==
The mission of AMANET is to promote capacity strengthening and networking of malaria research and development in Africa.

== Broad objective ==
To continue developing self-sustainable centres in Africa that meet international requirements for conducting malaria intervention trials.

== Organization Structure ==
The organization structure of AMANET comprises the General Assembly, Board of Trustees, the Secretariat, Scientific Coordinating Committee, Scientific Advisory Panel, Trial Sites Development Committee and Expert Committees.

The General Assembly comprising representatives of malaria R&D institutions in Africa and allied institutions outside Africa is the topmost organ. It generally meets every two years and is responsible for electing the board of trustees and the Scientific Coordinating Committee.

The Board of Trustees is the ultimate authority in matters of policy and investment. It oversees the general governance, regulation and control of AMANET.

The Scientific Coordinating Committee is constituted of senior research scientists elected by the General Assembly. It is responsible for receiving and reviewing reports from the Secretariat and from the Expert Committees. The SCC advises the board of trustees on scientific matters. Its functions also include the reviewing of research proposals and letters of expression of interest and the monitoring and evaluation of ongoing and completed research projects.

The Secretariat is the executive organ of the Trust, serving the board of trustees and all the committees.

The Trial Sites Development Committee a committee of experts appointed by the board of trustees from SCC to advise AMANET on specific issues relating to the development of trial sites.

The Scientific Advisory Panel is a panel of experts from various disciplines from whom ad hoc Expert Committees are formed to advise AMANET on specific research and scientific issues.

== Product research and development ==
Among the cherished goals of AMANET is to develop sustainable human and infrastructure capacity for African owned and led institutions to undertake malaria vaccine trials that are appropriate for Africans living in malaria-endemic areas. The current focus is to support the creation of a spectrum of interventional tools, especially vaccines that are efficacious, acceptable, affordable and readily accessible. The following are AMANET's candidate malaria vaccine portfolio:

- The Merozoite Surface Protein - Long Synthetic Peptide (MSP3 LSP): This is the leading product which has already been shown to be safe in adults in Africa. The vaccine is currently undergoing testing for safety in children both in Burkina Faso and shortly in Tanzania. Should the safety profile be established to be safe, the vaccine will be taken through phase IIb immunogenicity trials that would also establish the proof of limited efficacy
- The Apical Membrane Antigen (AMA1): This the second vaccine in development and is now undergoing phase Ib evaluation in adults Mali. During the last quarter of 2007, an evaluation of the safety results was done, and AMA1 was found to be safe in African adults..
- The GMZ2: The third vaccine in the portfolio was recently initiated in phase Ib adult study in Gabon. This product is expected to undergo a similar developmental pathway should it continue to have good results. This product is unique because it is a hybrid molecule with two potential targets on the malaria parasite; GLURP and MSP3.

It is expected that within the next three years several trials of these candidate vaccines shall be undertaken at the auspices of AMANET. Other candidate vaccines which meet the required profile are welcome to the AMANET malaria vaccine development programme.

== Capacity strengthening ==
Human resource and infrastructure development for malaria interventions in Africa is of up most priority to AMANET. This goal is being realized through both short-term trainings as well as direct financial support of the core centres. AMANET conducts short-term trainings through various workshops conducted throughout Africa, around six times a year. Additionally AMANET supports long-term training of individuals from AMANET funded sites which include:

- Tanzania-National Institute for Medical Research (NIMR) Tanga: The programme has steadily continued. We are currently preparing the site for the first vaccine trial of MSP3 in children 1–2 years. The site characterization activities are near completion; Two staff members at the site are currently taking AMANET sponsored long term training programs at MSc and PhD level.
- Zambia-Tropical Diseases Research Centre (TDRC) Ndola: The centre is on the capacity development programme having received a strengthening grant. Two AMANET sponsored students are completing the training masters level.
- Burkina Faso-Centre de National Recherché et de Formation sur le Paludisme (CNRFP) Ouagadougou: The site is currently conducting phase Ib trial of the MSP3 candidate vaccine. Two immunologists were sent to Netherlands for two weeks on specific training to transfer technology and establish cellular assays. This has led to technology transfer with their lab now able to handle the relevant immunological assays to support the clinical trials.
- Uganda-The Makerere University: The site has become the newest to receive a grant from AMANET for capacity strengthening in preparation for vaccine trials. It has, in parallel, received a grant for ethics committee strengthening.

== Building institutional capacities in Health Research Ethics in Africa ==
This is a new project at AMANET funded by the Bill and Melinda Gates Foundation aimed at strengthening Health Research Ethics (HRE) capacity in Africa. The project aims at ensuring that as the African populations are recruited into health research projects, the protection of their welfare and interests is enhanced. The HRE project has three parts: building Health Research Ethics capacity, online Health Research Ethics discussion forum and Ask the Expert/Ethicist.

The HRE capacity building project focuses on training ethics committee members on Research Ethics in order to improve the ethical review process of committees that are mandated to safeguard the welfare of research participants. In order to concentrate on activities that have greater potential to strengthen the Ethics Committees, a baseline survey was conducted to identify area of weakness that need to be addressed. A cohort of 21 Ethics Committees is being enrolled in this project and will be involved in various activities aimed at addressing areas of weakness in the review process. These committees are being provided with a sub-grant to support infrastructure and administration at their committees.

Overall, activities are spread over a period of three years, and they include, besides capacity strengthening and infrastructure support, a series of eight Research Ethics training workshops, two of which will be in French (for the benefit of the participating Francophone countries). Through the workshops, Standard Operating Procedures (SOPs) will be developed/improved, and an additional workshop focussing on harmonization of SOPs will be organised. In addition, a workshop on Research Ethics will be organised specifically for investigators.

It is envisaged that overall the HRE capacity building programme will contribute towards the establishment of competent and independent Ethics Committees that have well-equipped offices, functional and harmonised SOPs, electronic databases and archiving systems, and trained members who network and interact through online discussion forum and workshops.

== The Afro Immuno-Assay Network ==
Afro Immuno-Assay Network, started by AMANET in 2003, has been working on developing standardized immunological assays using the same reagents and statistical tools to assess the association between acquisition of malaria specific antibody responses starting with four potential malaria vaccine candidate antigens and subsequent protection from clinical malaria. This is a concerted network of eight African countries/Institutions with different geographical and epidemiological settings comprising low to holoendemic malaria and three supporting European institutions. Now the AIA network is under a new five-year project, within the European Malaria Vaccine Development Association (EMVDA) Consortium. In this Integrated Project, the AIA network focuses on standardization and validation of its immunological assays, expand to include new partners, further training for participating African immunologists and enhancement of laboratory expertise to include functional assays required for malaria vaccine evaluation.

== Short and long-term training ==
During the first Strategic Planning period, AMANET supported and organized several training workshops which benefited over 1000 African malaria researchers and associated personnel. In the process a comprehensive repository of expertise essential for the evaluation of malaria interventions, is being built up. Some of the former AMANET trainees have become experts in these areas. During this strategic plan period, AMANET will draw upon this vast expertise to constitute teams of trainers that facilitate short term training for AMANET beneficiary institutions, and for others upon request. The training will be in such areas as Health Research Ethics review in Africa; development of Standard Operating Procedures for Ethical Review Committee; Health Research Ethics for Investigators; Good Laboratory Practice and Standard Operating Procedures; Good clinical practice; Good Clinical Practice for African clinical monitors; Design, methodology and data management in intervention trials; Roles and operations of Data Safety Monitoring Boards (DSMB).

Given the ever-rising demands for AMANET short-term training, alternative teaching methods have been developed and are being utilized. Web-based training on health research ethics (HRE) is in good progress. The AMANET HRE web-based course has been very successfully accessed through the AMANET website. The online course was launched in September 2006 and to date over 150 participants have successfully completed the course and over 430 candidates have registered for the course. Participants have been drawn from Africa, Europe and the US. Based on its success, AMANET has acquired other resources to continue the project and also expand the e-learning opportunities to include other courses such a GCP, French version of the same course, and an Advanced Ethics Course.

== The Multilateral Initiative on Malaria ==
From January 2006, AMANET became host to the Multilateral Initiative on Malaria Secretariat. This is a global alliance of individuals, funding partners and four autonomous constituents comprising the MIM Secretariat, MIM/TDR, MIMCom and MR4. Its mission is to strengthen and sustain, through collaborative research and training, to carry out research that is required to develop and improve tools for malaria control, and to strengthen the research control interphase.

== Acknowledgements ==
AMANET acknowledges financial support from the Ministry of Foreign Affairs (Netherlands), the Danish International Development Agency, the European Commission's Directorate-General Research and AIDCO, the Bill and Melinda Gates Foundation, the European and Developing Countries Clinical Trials Partnership and the African Caribbean Pacific (ACP) Secretariat for including AMANET in their portfolio for EDF9 support.
