= Dense granule =

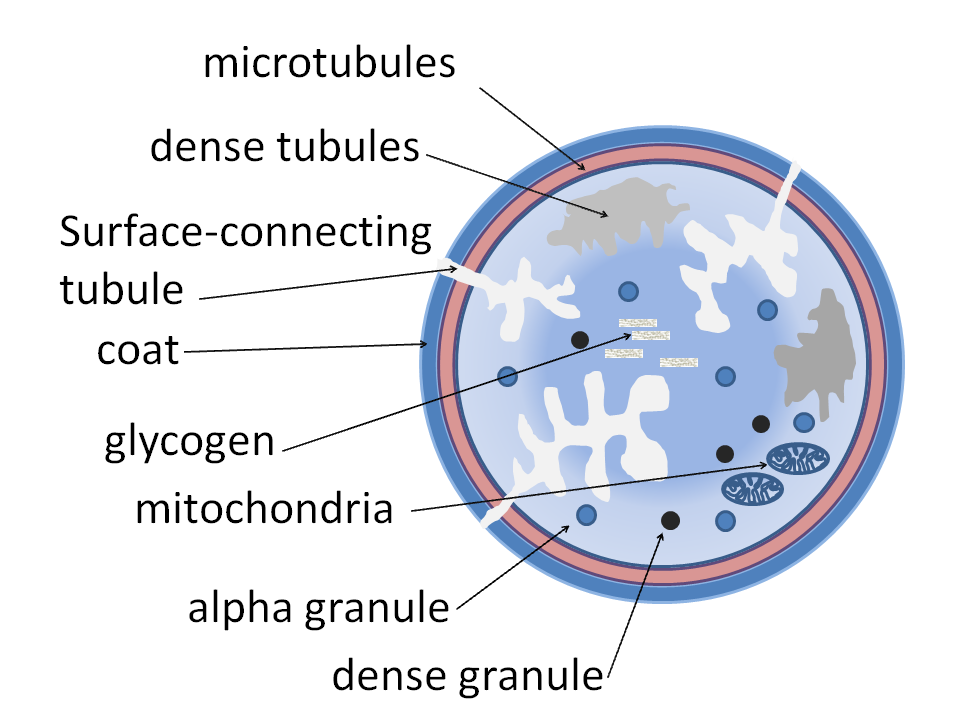
- Dense granules shown in a platelet

Details

Identifiers
- Latin: granulum delta
- TH: H2.00.04.1.03006

Dense granules (also known as dense bodies or delta granules) are specialized secretory organelles. Dense granules are found only in platelets and are smaller than alpha granules. The origin of these dense granules is still unknown, however, it is thought that may come from the mechanism involving the endocytotic pathway. Dense granules are a sub group of lysosome-related organelles (LRO). There are about three to eight of these in a normal human platelet.

== In unicellular organisms ==
They are found in animals and in unicellular organisms including Apicomplexa protozoans.

They are also found in Entamoeba.

Dense granules play a major role in Toxoplasma gondii. When the parasite invades it releases its dense granules which help to create the parasitophorous vacuole.

=== Toxoplasma gondii ===
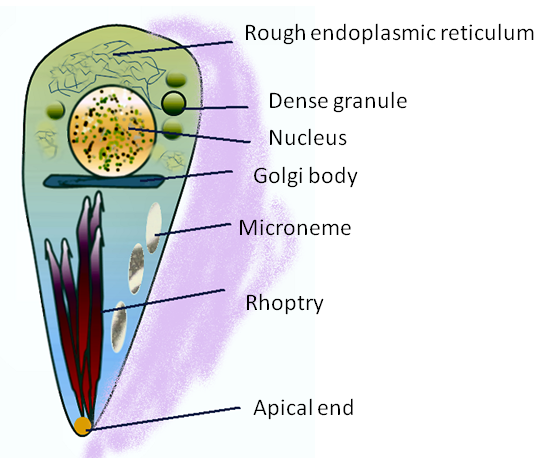
Diagram of T. gondii structure with dense granules

Toxoplasma gondii contains unique organelles including dense granules. Dense granules, along with other secretory vesicles such as a microneme and rhoptry secrete proteins involved in the gliding motility, invasion, and parasitophorous vacuole formation of T. gondii. Dense granules specifically secrete their contents several minutes after parasite invasion and localization into the parasitophorous vacuole. Proteins released from these specialized organelles are critical to adapting to the intracellular environment of the invaded host cell and contribute to parasitophorous vacuolar structure and maintenance.

==== Structure and biogenesis ====
Dense granules in T. gondii are spherical, electron dense bodies that resemble secretory vesicles in mammalian cells about 200 nm in diameter and most likely form from budding off the trans-golgi network. Dense granule (GRA) protein aggregation and retention is vital to maintaining dense granule biogenesis. This process is thought to follow the sorting-by-retention model of higher eukaryotes due to the morphological similarities of T. gondii's dense granule and higher eukaryotes' dense core granules. The proposition posits that the accumulation of secretory proteins within the granules prevents their escape from maturing dense granules in the trans-golgi network by constitutive vesicle budding. Additionally, dense granule formation is clathrin dependent at the trans-golgi network. T. gondii expresses one clathrin heavy chain (CHC1) important for forming micronemes and rhoptries in T. gondii, but the adaptor important for targeting CHC1 to dense granules remains unknown. After clathrin is recruited, the mature dense granules bud off the Golgi apparatus and are shuttled to plasma membrane release sites in order to secrete their contents.

==== Trafficking and secretion of dense granule proteins (GRAs) ====
The majority of dense granule proteins or GRA proteins contain an N-terminal ER-targeting signal peptide and enter the secretory pathway via synthesis and translocation at the rough endoplasmic reticulum, and the signal sequence is thought to be cleaved off though not proven. Many GRA proteins contain a single transmembrane domain, meaning that the proteins are translocated across the endoplasmic reticulum lumen, exported to and shuttled through the Golgi apparatus, and eventually secreted from the parasite into the vacuolar space or parasitophorous vacuolar membrane. SNARE protein complexes drive the transport and docking of vesicles with proteins from the endoplasmic reticulum to the golgi body and vice versa.

Once the dense granule organelle is fully matured, the organelle appears to directly fuse with the plasma membrane between gaps of the parasite's inner membrane complex. Dense granule secretion contains characteristics of both regulated and constitutive secretory pathways. Despite GRA proteins accumulating rapidly as a "burst" after a few minutes into invasion to help facilitate the newly formed parasitophorous vacuole similarly to a regulated secretory event, secretion of GRA proteins is a constitutive process independent of calcium occurring throughout the parasite's life cycle both intracellularly and extracellularly.

==== Functions ====
According to the stage of infection, the number of dense granules present in a parasite may vary from approximately 15 in tachyzoites and sporozoites, 8–10 in bradyzoites and 3–6 in merozoites. After invading a host cell and setting up the parasitophorous vacuole, dense granules secrete their dense granule proteins (GRAs) into the vacuolar space where the proteins will insert into the vacuole's membrane, stay in the vacuole lumen, interact with the intravacuolar network or be secreted into the host cell. In order to scavenge and sequester host cells' nutrients and lipids, the intravacuolar network (IVN) must first be formed by T. gondii. This network of membranous tubules is involved in acquiring nutrients, modulating immune response, and facilitating cyst development. Then, GRA proteins can associate with the IVN, allowing for nutrient acquisition. For nutrient acquisition, GRA proteins have been implicated in scavenging host lipids, such as sphingolipids from host Golgi derived vesicles, cholesterol from host endosomal or lysosomal vesicles, and other lipids from host neutral lipid droplets. GRA proteins also are involved in host protein uptake into the parasite.

GRA proteins secreted into the host cell cytosol are implicated in altering host cell gene expression and immune responses. Altering these responses allows parasite replication, proper growth, and egress of parasites. Other things GRA proteins secreted into the host cell are implicated in include host cell cycle arrest and control, host cell immune responses including NF-kB, IFN-γ, and p38 mitogen-activated protein kinases pathways, and host cell antigen presentation.

While not all of the T. gondii GRA proteins have been characterized, some novel GRA proteins are important for parasite replication, virulence, and cyst formation. Other new GRA proteins have been implicated in parasite egress and calcium homeostasis. Further research is needed to characterize the function and prevalence of all GRA proteins.

== In multicellular organisms ==
=== Components ===
The dense granules of human platelets contain adenosine diphosphate (ADP), adenosine triphosphate (ATP), ionized calcium (which is necessary for several steps of the coagulation cascade), and serotonin. Dense granules are similar to lysosomes with an acidic pH and even some lysosomal proteins like CD63. There is a granular adenine nucleotide pool within the dense granule. It is thought that it is made up of system of insoluble calcium. This pool is likely to be different than that of the cytoplasmic nucleotides. In some animals it has been shown that the platelets contain histamine. During exocytosis, the pool of ATP within the dense granule is released. Serotonin is picked up by the dense granules where it interacts with ATP and calcium. The serotonin that is then released by the dense granule, recruits other platelets and helps play a major role in stopping the loss of blood at the injury. The calcium from a dense granule accounts for the majority of the calcium within the platelets and plays a role in the binding of different proteins.

=== Clinical significance ===
A deficiency of CD63 can be associated with Hermansky–Pudlak syndrome. The patients with this disease show signs of abnormal dense granules and melanosomes which can cause prolonged bleeding and albinism. Chediak-Higashi syndrome is an autosomal recessive disorder where patients platelets have a deficient amount of dense granules. CHS is very similar to beige mouse.

=== Biogenesis ===
The dense granule is very important in the coagulation cascade because of the bleeding disorders caused by a dense granule deficiency. However, the exact details of how it created is unknown. It has been observed that they are produced in bone marrow by megakaryocytes. Within the megakaryocytes it is thought that their production has something to do with the endocytotic pathway. Dense granules have their components sent to maturing dense granules using vesicular nucleotide transporters. This is what is thought to cause the build up of ADP/ATP in dense granules. This mechanism is also responsible for the build up of MRP4 which picks up cAMP for the dense granule. Mice with MRP4-/- will have dysfunctional platelets from cAMP not being takin up from the cytosol and placed into the dense granule.

=== Membrane ===
There are a number of proteins that are within the dense granule membrane. To maintain the low pH within the granule, there is a Hydrogen ion pumping ATPase. Ral has been found within the granule's membrane. There are several adhesive receptors that have luminal binding domains and are expressed post exocytosis. These adhesive receptors help the adhesive receptors on the surface of the platelets. One of these receptors is GPIb. GPIb is one of the more important receptors within platelets.

=== Function ===
The true function of a dense granule is still unknown. However, the secretion of dense granules occurs along with platelet activation. Both, ADP and collagen can cause the secretion of dense granules. Patients and mice with dense granule deficiency have a harder time forming a hemostatic plug and therefore have a longer bleed time.

== Detection ==
The dense granules' matrix is dense with electrons that allow them to be detected through whole mount electron microscopy. The calcium levels within the dense granule allows for no extra staining when viewing the dense granule with an electron microscope. When observed by using transmission electron microscopy (TEM), these granules are osmophilic. The secretion of dense granules can be detected by seeing how much ATP/ADP is being released with luciferase-based luminescence. The relationship to ATP/ADP released can be used to then determine the secretion of dense granules. Another option is to observe the amount of serotonin being released from a platelet with a large amount of serotonin already on it. Another way to detect the secretion of dense granules is through flow cytometry. Since dense granules have surface membrane proteins, the activation of CD63 and LAMP-2 can be observed with flow cytometry.

== See also ==
- Platelet alpha-granule
- Dense bodies
