= KAHRP =

Knob-associated histidine-rich protein

Identifiers
- Organism: Plasmodium falciparum
- Symbol: ?
- UniProt: P09346
Search for
- Structures: Swiss-model
- Domains: InterPro

EMP3-KAHRP-like N-terminal domain

Identifiers
- Symbol: EKAL
- Pfam: PF17986
- InterPro: IPR040805
Available protein structures:
- Pfam: structures / ECOD
- PDB: RCSB PDB; PDBe; PDBj
- PDBsum: structure summary
- EMP3 refers to "Erythrocyte membrane protein 3." It is likely a misnomer, as no reported PfEMP3 sequences contain this domain. PfEMP3 is arranged next to KAHRP in the P. falciparum genome, a probable cause of misidentification.

KAHRP (knob-associated histidine-rich protein) is a protein expressed by Plasmodium falciparum infecting erythrocytes. KAHRP is a major component of knobs, feature found on Plasmodium falciparum infected erythrocytes.

It has been suggested that KAHRP may play a role in trafficking or docking PfEMP1, major malarial cytoadherence protein to the erythrocyte membrane; however, these findings were disputed by recent NMR and fluorescence anisotropy studies showing no interaction between PfEMP1 and KAHRP.

Instead, KAHRP was shown to interact with Ankyrin, more precisely the D3 subunit of the Membrane-binding domain of Ankyrin type 1. This interaction was suggested via SPR, ELISA, and Pulldown studies, however, it has not been confirmed by NMR, ITC, crystallography, or fluorescence anisotropy.
