= Dense bodies =

Dense body may refer to:

- Dense granule, a secretory organelle
- Ribbon synapse, a type of neuronal synapse
- Electron-dense portions of smooth muscle
