= Rhoptry =

Organelle of parasites involved in host invasion

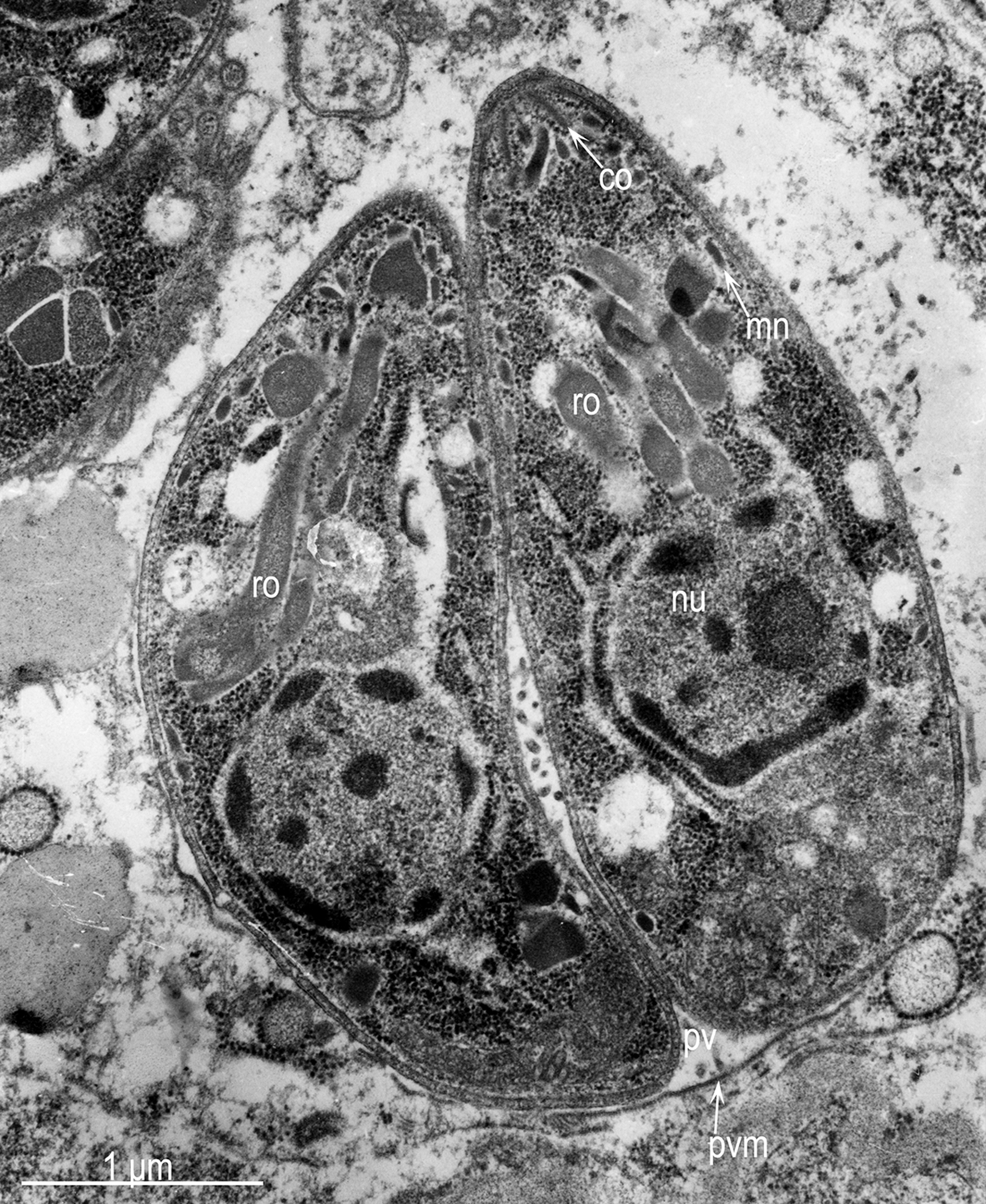
Tachyzoites of Toxoplasma gondii, transmission electron microscopy. Rhoptries: ro (click to enlarge)

A rhoptry is a specialized secretory organelle found in Apicomplexa protozoan parasites. Rhoptries are club-shaped organelles connected by thin necks to the extreme apical pole of the parasite. These organelles, like micronemes, are characteristic of the motile stages of Apicomplexa protozoans. They can vary in number and shape and contain numerous enzymes that are released during the process of host penetration. The proteins they contain are important in the interaction between the host and the parasite, including the formation of the parasitophorous vacuole (PV).

== Characteristics ==
Rhoptries are one of the three characteristic secretory organelles present in all Apicomplexa along with micronemes and dense granules. Rhoptries and micronemes are localized at the apical complex of the Apicomplexan organism, which suggests common ancestry of the members of the phylum and the evolution process they have experienced. The name rhoptry indicates its shape as it comes from the Greek word for "club-shaped." These large membrane-bound organelles are electron-dense and highly acidic and have similar high density across those in Apicomplexan species.

There is a variation in the number of rhoptries present in different species and during different developmental stages. For example, the tachyzoite stage of Toxoplasma gondii, which is found during the acute phase of toxoplasmosis, has 10 to 12 rhoptries, while the bradyzoite stage observed during the chronic phase of the infection has one to three rhoptries. Plasmodium falciparum merozoites have two, the sporozoites have two to four, and the noninvasive ookinetes have none. Meanwhile, Cryptosporidium sporozoites only have a single rhoptry.

== Structure and content ==
Rhoptry mainly comprises two regions: the rhoptry neck and the rhoptry bulb. Those two regions physically divide the parasites and have different features and materials. The rhoptry neck is an electron-dense duct that narrowly extends at the anterior tip and contains the rhoptry neck proteins (RONs), which are named after where they localize in the parasite. On the other hand, the rhoptry bulb is a larger, bulbous base that is electron-lucent and contains the rhoptry bulb proteins (ROPs) and membranous materials. So far, over 20 rhoptry bulb proteins have been identified in T. gondii. These two classes of proteins follow the typical secretory pathway from the endoplasmic reticulum to the Golgi, then are trafficked to the rhoptries, where they are typically stored. RONs and ROPs have critical functions in host invasion and in the replication of Apicomplexan parasites. During the host invasion process, the proteins are secreted at different times at which they each function. RONs are exocytosed first because they contribute during the invasion. ROPs follow afterward and perform a post-invasion role.

== Synthesis ==
De novo assembly of rhoptries occurs during cell replication. They are first synthesized as pre-rhoptries, which are spherical-shaped, trans-Golgi-derived vesicles. Yet, how these immature rhoptries are formed is still unknown. Pre-rhoptries elongate and mature into the functional rhoptries just before cytokinesis, which then move to the apexes of the parasites to localize to their normal position—the apical complexes.

== Functions ==
The three unique secretory organelles of Apicomplexa—micronemes, rhoptries, and dense granules—release their contents by exocytosis at different stages of the host invasion as the process is regulated in time and space. Microneme contents are secreted first to the apical end of the parasite when the parasite attaches to the host cell, followed by rhoptry as invasion proceeds, and then dense granules near post-invasion. The micronemal proteins secreted to the parasite's surface direct the rhoptry proteins to the host cell by forming complexes together. The rhoptry proteins then localize to different locations within the host cell, including the plasma membrane, the cytosol, the nucleus, the parasitophorous vacuole membrane (PVM), and the PV lumen. The primary functions of rhoptries are to assist host invasion and to exploit host cellular functions for enhanced parasitism. Still, the specific roles differ depending on where they localize within the host upon direct injection into the host cytoplasm and on the host species. During the initial stage of host invasion, rhoptry contents help the parasite attach to the host, and the rhoptry membranous material forms the PVM around the parasite entering the host cell to establish its protective intracellular protective compartment for successful development by inducing invagination of its plasma membrane. In Plasmodium, some rhoptry proteins localize to the PVM and promote the formation of the vacuole. Apicomplexan parasites also utilize rhoptries to divert the host cell's immune response. The host can come to favor the parasitic invasion if the rhoptry proteins manipulate the host's actin cytoskeleton. Furthermore, rhoptry proteins in Toxoplasma gondii can mistraffic the host's immune factors for its virulence. Another function of rhoptry proteins is nutrient import during the lytic cycle of Apicomplexa.
