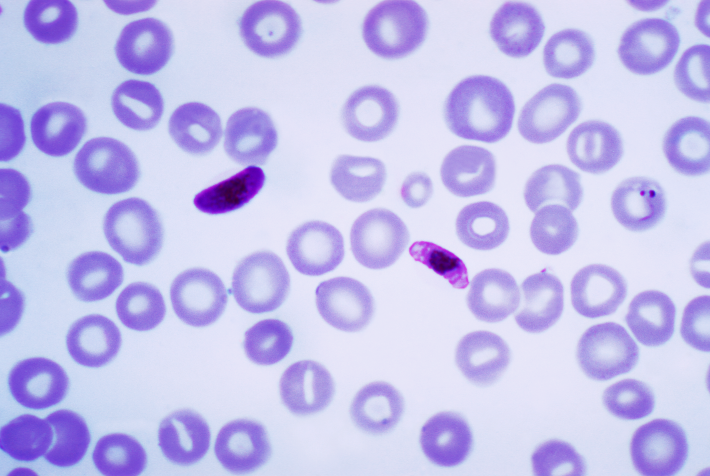
- Macrogametocyte (left) and microgametocyte (right) of P. falciparum

Scientific classification
- Domain: Eukaryota
- Supergroup: Alveolata
- Phylum: Apicomplexa
- Class: Aconoidasida
- Order: Haemospororida
- Family: Plasmodiidae
- Genus: Plasmodium
- Species: P. falciparum

Binomial name
- Plasmodium falciparum (Welch, 1897)

Synonyms
- Oscillaria malariae Laveran, 1881; Plasmodium malariae Marchiafava and Celli, 1885; Laverania malariae Feletti and Grassi, 1890; Ematozoo falciforme Antolisei and Angelini, 1890; Haemamoeba immaculata Grassi, 1891; Haemamoeba laverani Labbe, 1894; Haematozoon falciforme Thayer and Hewetson, 1895; Haematozoon falciparum Welch, 1897; Haemosporidium sedecimanae Lewkowicz, 1897; Haemosporidium undecimanae Lewkowicz, 1897; Haemosporidium vigesimotertianae Lewkowicz, 1897

= Plasmodium falciparum =

Protozoan species of malaria parasite

Plasmodium falciparum is a unicellular protozoan parasite of humans and is the deadliest species of Plasmodium that causes malaria in humans. The parasite is transmitted through the bite of a female Anopheles mosquito and causes the disease's most dangerous form, falciparum malaria. P. falciparum is therefore regarded as the deadliest parasite in humans. It is also associated with the development of blood cancer (Burkitt's lymphoma) and is classified as a Group 2A (probable) carcinogen.

The species originated from the malarial parasite Laverania found in gorillas, around 10,000 years ago. Alphonse Laveran was the first to identify the parasite in 1880, and named it Oscillaria malariae. Ronald Ross discovered its transmission by mosquito in 1897. Giovanni Battista Grassi elucidated the complete transmission from a female anopheline mosquito to humans in 1898. In 1897, William H. Welch created the name Plasmodium falciparum, which ICZN formally adopted in 1954. P. falciparum assumes several different forms during its life cycle. The human-infective stage are sporozoites from the salivary gland of a mosquito. The sporozoites grow and multiply in the liver to become merozoites. These merozoites invade the erythrocytes (red blood cells) to form trophozoites, schizonts and gametocytes, during which the symptoms of malaria are produced. In the mosquito, the gametocytes undergo sexual reproduction to a zygote, which turns into an ookinete. The ookinete forms oocytes from which sporozoites are formed.

In 2024, malaria caused an estimated 282 million cases and 610,000 deaths worldwide. The World Health Organization (WHO) African Region accounted for approximately 95% of cases and deaths, with children under five accounting for approximately 75% of malaria deaths in that region. Nearly all malaria related deaths are caused by P. falciparum. In Sub-Saharan Africa, almost 100% of cases were due to P. falciparum, whereas in most other regions where malaria is endemic, other, less virulent plasmodial species predominate.

== History ==
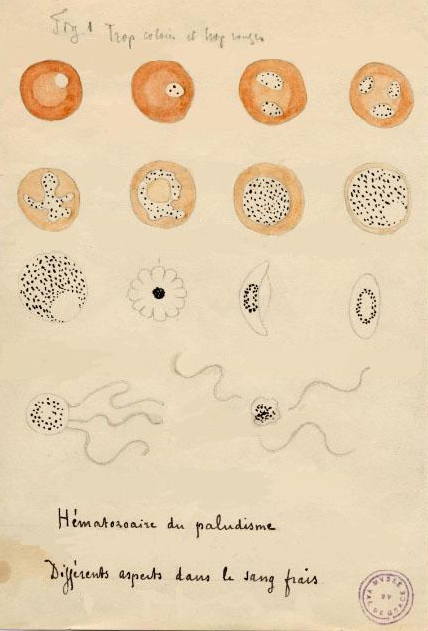
Laveran's drawing of various stages of P. falciparum as seen on fresh blood (1880).

Falciparum malaria was familiar to the ancient Greeks, who gave the general name πυρετός (pyretós) "fever". Hippocrates (c. 460–370 BCE) gave several descriptions on tertian fever and quartan fever. It was prevalent throughout the ancient Egyptian and Roman civilizations. It was the Romans who named the disease "malaria"—mala for bad, and aria for air, as they believed that the disease was spread by contaminated air, or miasma. This belief was abandoned in the modern era with the advent of germ theory.

=== Discovery ===
A German physician, Johann Friedrich Meckel, was likely the first to see P. falciparum, though he did not know what it was. In 1847, he reported the presence of black pigment granules from the blood and spleen of a patient who died of malaria. The French Army physician Charles Louis Alphonse Laveran, while working at Bône Hospital (now Annaba in Algeria), correctly identified the parasite as a causative pathogen of malaria in 1880. He presented his discovery before the French Academy of Medicine in Paris and published it in The Lancet in 1881. He gave it the scientific name Oscillaria malariae. However, his discovery was received with skepticism, mainly because by that time, leading physicians such as Theodor Albrecht Edwin Klebs and Corrado Tommasi-Crudeli claimed that they had discovered a bacterium (which they called Bacillus malariae) as the pathogen of malaria. Laveran's discovery was only widely accepted after five years when Camillo Golgi confirmed the parasite using better microscopes and staining techniques. Laveran was awarded the Nobel Prize in Physiology or Medicine in 1907 for his work. In 1900, the Italian zoologist Giovanni Battista Grassi categorized Plasmodium species based on the timing of fever in the patient; malignant tertian malaria was caused by Laverania malariae (now P. falciparum), benign tertian malaria by Haemamoeba vivax (now P. vivax), and quartan malaria by Haemamoeba malariae (now P. malariae).

The British physician Patrick Manson formulated the mosquito-malaria theory in 1894; until that time, malarial parasites were believed to be spread in air as miasma, a Greek word for pollution. His colleague Ronald Ross of the Indian Medical Service validated the theory while working in India. Ross discovered in 1897 that malarial parasites lived in certain mosquitoes. The next year, he demonstrated that a malarial parasite of birds (Plasmodium relictum) could be transmitted by mosquitoes from one bird to another. Around the same time, Grassi demonstrated that P. falciparum was transmitted in humans only by female anopheline mosquitos (in his case Anopheles claviger). Ross, Manson and Grassi were nominated for the Nobel Prize in Physiology or Medicine in 1902. Under controversial circumstances, only Ross was selected for the award. There was a long debate on the taxonomy. It was only in 1954 the International Commission on Zoological Nomenclature officially approved the binomial Plasmodium falciparum. The valid genus Plasmodium was created by two Italian physicians Ettore Marchiafava and Angelo Celli in 1885. The Greek word plasma means "mould" or "form"; oeidēs means "to see" or "to know." The species name was introduced by an American physician William Henry Welch in 1897. It is derived from the Latin falx, meaning "sickle" and parum meaning "like or equal to another".

=== Origin and evolution ===
P. falciparum is now generally accepted to have evolved from Laverania (a subgenus of Plasmodium found in apes) species present in gorillas in Western Africa. Genetic diversity indicates that the human protozoan emerged around 10,000 years ago. The closest relative of P. falciparum is P. praefalciparum, a parasite of gorillas, as supported by mitochondrial, apicoplastic and nuclear DNA sequences. These two species are closely related to the chimpanzee parasite P. reichenowi, which was previously thought to be the closest relative of P. falciparum. P. falciparum was also once thought to originate from a parasite of birds.

Levels of genetic polymorphism are extremely low within the P. falciparum genome compared to that of closely related, ape infecting species of Plasmodium (including P. praefalciparum). This suggests that the origin of P. falciparum in humans is recent, as a single P. praefalciparum strain became capable of infecting humans. The genetic information of P. falciparum has signaled a recent expansion that coincides with the agricultural revolution. The development of extensive agriculture likely increased mosquito population densities by giving rise to more breeding sites, which may have triggered the evolution and expansion of P. falciparum.

== Structure ==
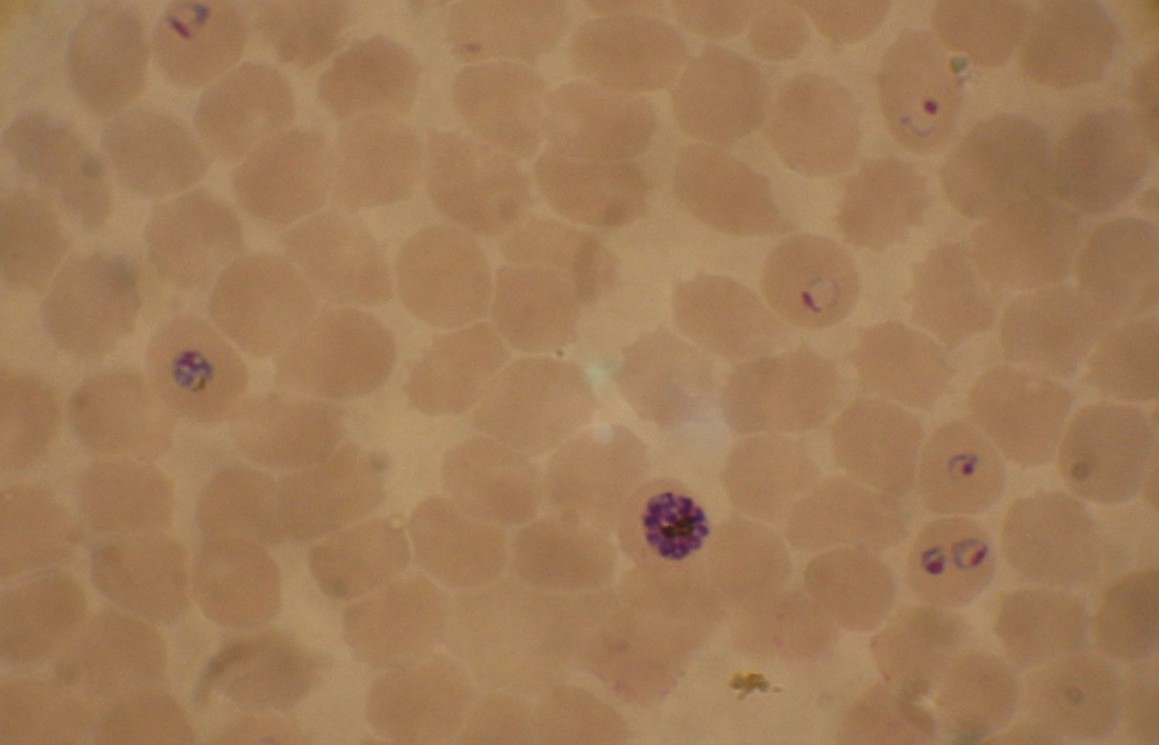
Blood smear from a P. falciparum culture (K1 strain - asexual forms) - several red blood cells have ring stages inside them. Close to the center is a schizont and on the left a trophozoite.

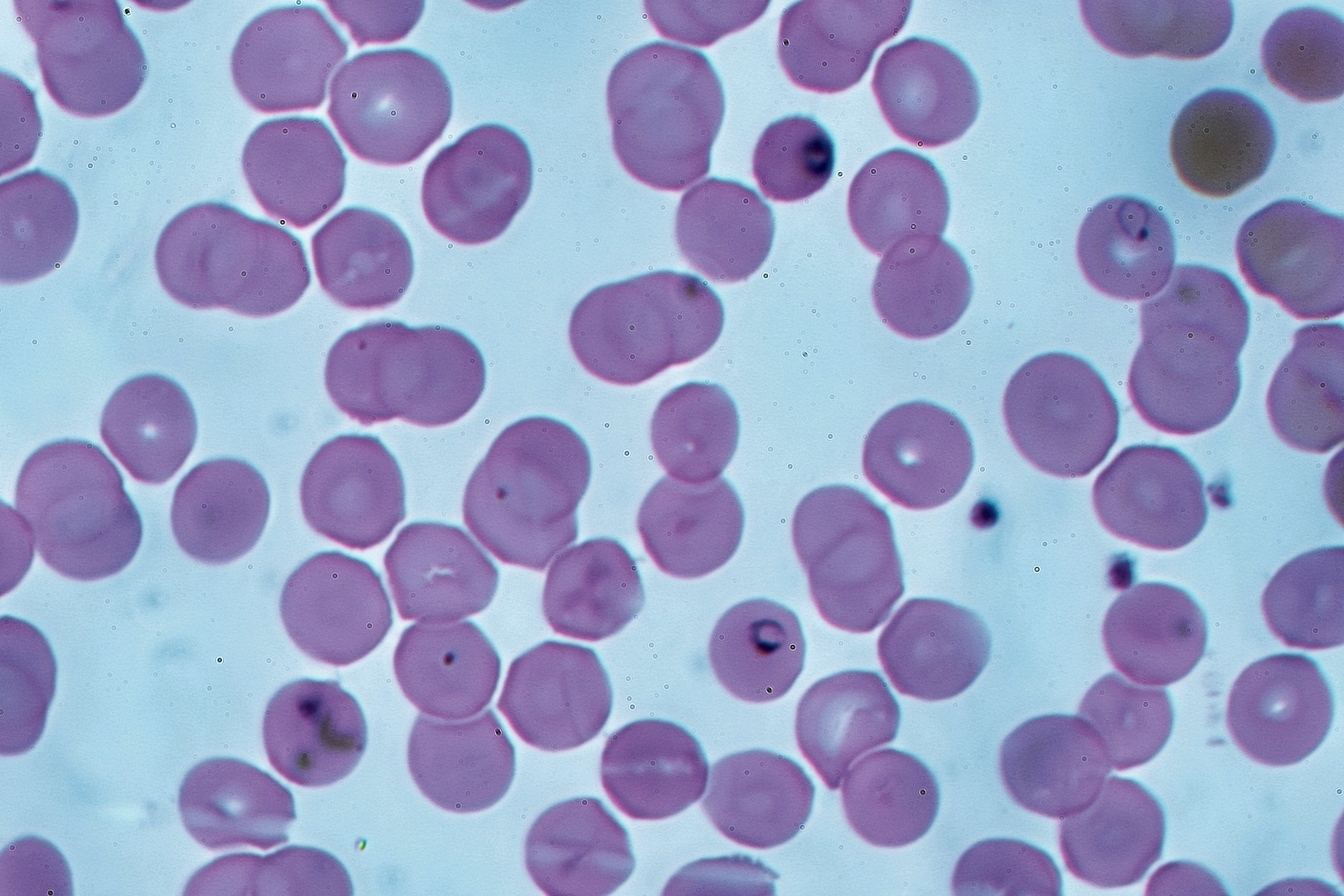
Ring forms in red blood cells (Giemsa stain)

P. falciparum does not have a fixed structure but undergoes continuous change during its life cycle. A sporozoite is spindle-shaped and 10–15 μm long. In the liver, it grows into an ovoid schizont of 30–70 μm in diameter. Each schizont produces merozoites, each of which is roughly 1.5 μm in length and 1 μm in diameter. In the erythrocyte the merozoite forms a ring-like structure, becoming a trophozoite. A trophozoite feeds on the haemoglobin and forms a granular pigment called haemozoin. Unlike those of other Plasmodium species, the gametocytes of P. falciparum are elongated and crescent-shaped, by which they are sometimes identified. A mature gametocyte is 8–12 μm long and 3–6 μm wide. The ookinete is also elongated measuring about 18–24 μm. An oocyst is rounded and can grow up to 80 μm in diameter. Microscopic examination of a blood film reveals only early (ring-form) trophozoites and gametocytes that are in the peripheral blood. Mature trophozoites or schizonts do not appear in peripheral blood smears, as these are usually sequestered in the tissues. On occasion, faint, comma-shaped, red dots are seen on the erythrocyte surface. These dots are Maurer's cleft and are secretory organelles that produce proteins and enzymes essential for nutrient uptake and immune evasion processes.

The apical complex, which is a combination of organelles, is an important structure. It contains secretory organelles called rhoptries and micronemes, which are vital for mobility, adhesion, host cell invasion, and parasitophorous vacuole formation. As an apicomplexan, it harbours a plastid, an apicoplast, similar to plant chloroplasts, which they probably acquired by engulfing (or being invaded by) a eukaryotic alga and retaining the algal plastid as a distinctive organelle encased within four membranes. The apicoplast is involved in the synthesis of lipids and several other compounds and provides an attractive drug target. During the asexual blood stage of infection, an essential function of the apicoplast is to produce the isoprenoid precursors isopentenyl pyrophosphate (IPP) and dimethylallyl pyrophosphate (DMAPP) via the MEP (non-mevalonate) pathway.

=== Genome ===
In 1995 the Malaria Genome Project was set up to sequence the genome of P. falciparum. The genome of its mitochondrion was reported in 1995, that of the nonphotosynthetic plastid known as the apicoplast in 1996, and the sequence of the first nuclear chromosome (chromosome 2) in 1998. The sequence of chromosome 3 was reported in 1999 and the entire genome was reported on 3 October 2002. The roughly 24-megabase genome is extremely AT-rich (about 80%) and is organised into 14 chromosomes. Just over 5,300 genes were described. Many genes involved in antigenic variation are located in the subtelomeric regions of the chromosomes. These are divided into the var, rif, and stevor families. Within the genome, there exist 59 var, 149 rif, and 28 stevor genes, along with multiple pseudogenes and truncations. It is estimated that 551, or roughly 10%, of the predicted nuclear-encoded proteins are targeted to the apicoplast, while 4.7% of the proteome is targeted to the mitochondria.

== Life cycle ==
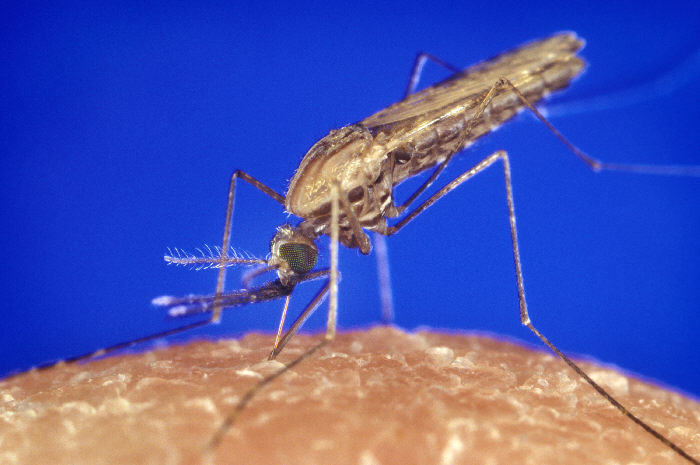
Anopheles mosquito, the carrier of Plasmodium falciparum

Humans are the intermediate hosts in which asexual reproduction occurs, and female anopheline mosquitoes are the definitive hosts harbouring the sexual reproduction stage.

=== In humans ===
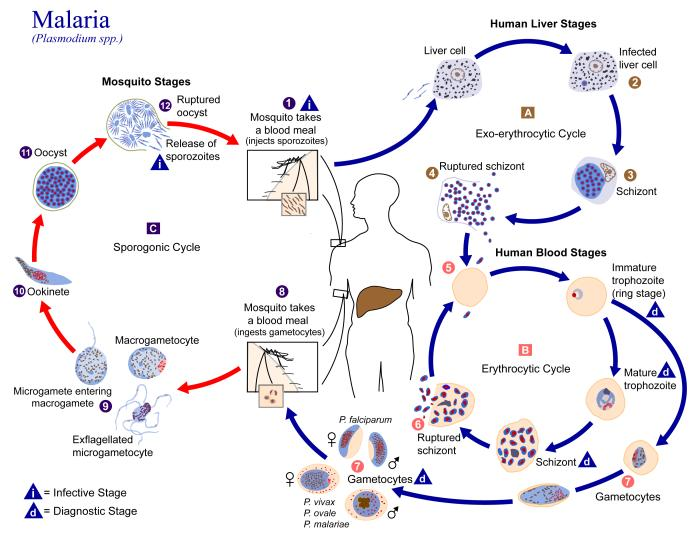
Life cycle of Plasmodium

Infection in humans begins with the bite of an infected female Anopheles mosquito. Out of about 460 species of Anopheles mosquito, more than 70 species transmit falciparum malaria. Anopheles gambiae is one of the best known and most prevalent vectors, particularly in Africa.

The infective stage called the sporozoite is released from the salivary glands through the proboscis of the mosquito to enter through the skin during feeding. The mosquito saliva contains antihemostatic and anti-inflammatory enzymes that disrupt blood clotting and inhibit the pain reaction. Typically, each infected bite contains 20–200 sporozoites. A proportion of sporozoites invade liver cells (hepatocytes). The sporozoites move in the bloodstream by gliding, which is driven by a motor made up of the proteins actin and myosin beneath their plasma membrane.

==== Liver stage or exo-erythrocytic schizogony ====
Entering the hepatocytes, the parasite loses its apical complex and surface coat and transforms into a trophozoite. Within the parasitophorous vacuole of the hepatocyte, it undergoes 13–14 rounds of mitosis which produce a syncytial cell (coenocyte) called a schizont. This process is called schizogony. A schizont contains tens of thousands of nuclei. From the surface of the schizont, tens of thousands of haploid (1n) daughter cells called merozoites emerge. The liver stage can produce up to 90,000 merozoites, which are eventually released into the bloodstream in parasite-filled vesicles called merosomes.

==== Blood stage or erythrocytic schizogony ====
Merozoites use the apicomplexan invasion organelles (apical complex, pellicle, and surface coat) to recognize and enter the host erythrocyte (red blood cell). The merozoites first bind to the erythrocyte in a random orientation. It then reorients such that the apical complex is in proximity to the erythrocyte membrane. The parasite forms a parasitophorous vacuole, to allow for its development inside the erythrocyte. This infection cycle occurs in a highly synchronous fashion, with roughly all of the parasites throughout the blood in the same stage of development. This precise clocking mechanism is dependent on the human host's own circadian rhythm.

Within the erythrocyte, the parasite metabolism depends on the digestion of haemoglobin. The clinical symptoms of malaria such as fever, anemia, and neurological disorder are produced during the blood stage.

The parasite can also alter the morphology of the erythrocyte, causing knobs on the erythrocyte membrane. Infected erythrocytes are often sequestered in various human tissues or organs, such as the heart, liver, and brain. This is caused by parasite-derived cell surface proteins being present on the erythrocyte membrane, and it is these proteins that bind to receptors in human cells. Sequestration in the brain causes cerebral malaria, a very severe form of the disease, which increases the victim's likelihood of death.

===== Trophozoite =====
After invading the erythrocyte, the parasite loses its specific invasion organelles (apical complex and surface coat) and de-differentiates into a round trophozoite located within a parasitophorous vacuole. The trophozoite feeds on the haemoglobin of the erythrocyte, digesting its proteins and converting (by biocrystallization) the remaining heme into insoluble and chemically inert β-hematin crystals called haemozoin. The young trophozoite (or "ring" stage, because of its morphology on stained blood films) grows substantially before undergoing multiplication.

===== Schizont =====
At the schizont stage, the parasite replicates its DNA multiple times and multiple mitotic divisions occur asynchronously. Cell division and multiplication in the erythrocyte is called erythrocytic schizogony. Each schizont forms 16-18 merozoites. The red blood cells are ruptured by the merozoites. The liberated merozoites invade fresh erythrocytes. A free merozoite is in the bloodstream for roughly 60 seconds before it enters another erythrocyte.

The duration of one complete erythrocytic schizogony is approximately 48 hours. This gives rise to the characteristic clinical manifestations of falciparum malaria, such as fever and chills, corresponding to the synchronous rupture of the infected erythrocytes.

===== Gametocyte =====
Some merozoites differentiate into sexual forms, male and female gametocytes. These gametocytes take roughly 7–15 days to reach full maturity, through the process called gametocytogenesis. P. falciparum gametocytes sequester in the bone marrow until they become stage V gametocytes. Mature gametocytes are then released into the peripheral blood where they can be taken up by a female Anopheles mosquito during a blood meal.

=== Incubation period ===
The time of appearance of the symptoms from infection (called incubation period) is shortest for P. falciparum among Plasmodium species. An average incubation period is 11 days, but may range from 9 to 30 days. In isolated cases, prolonged incubation periods as long as 2, 3 or even 8 years have been recorded. Pregnancy and co-infection with HIV are important conditions for delayed symptoms. Parasites can be detected from blood samples by the 10th day after infection (pre-patent period).

=== In mosquitoes ===
Within the mosquito midgut, the female gamete maturation process entails slight morphological changes, becoming more enlarged and spherical. The male gametocyte undergoes a rapid nuclear division within 15 minutes, producing eight flagellated microgametes by a process called exflagellation. The flagellated microgamete fertilizes the female macrogamete to produce a diploid cell called a zygote. The zygote then develops into an ookinete. The ookinete is a motile cell, capable of invading other organs of the mosquito. It traverses the peritrophic membrane of the mosquito midgut and crosses the midgut epithelium. Once through the epithelium, the ookinete enters the basal lamina and settles into an immotile oocyst. For several days, the oocyst undergoes 10 to 11 rounds of cell division to create a syncytial cell (sporoblast) containing thousands of nuclei. Meiosis takes place inside the sporoblast to produce over 3,000 haploid daughter cells called sporozoites on the surface of the mother cell. Immature sporozoites break through the oocyst wall into the haemolymph. They migrate to the mosquito salivary glands where they undergo further development and become infective to humans.

Effects of plant secondary metabolites on P. falciparum

Mosquitoes are known to forage on plant nectar for sugar meal, the primary source of energy and nutrients for their survival and other biological process such as host seeking for blood or searching for oviposition sites. Researchers have recently discovered that mosquitoes are very selective about their sugar meal sources. For example Anopheles mosquitoes prefer some plants over others, specifically those containing compounds that hinder the development and survival of malaria parasites inside the mosquito. This discovery offers an opportunity to look into what could be playing a role in these behavior changes in mosquitoes and also find out what they ingest when they foraged on the selected plants. In other studies, it has been shown that sources of sugars and some secondary metabolites e.g. ricinine, have contrasting effects on mosquito capacity to transmit the parasites malaria.

=== Meiosis ===
Plasmodium falciparum is haploid (one set of chromosomes) during its reproductive stages in human blood and liver. When a mosquito takes a blood meal from a plasmodium infected human host, this meal may include haploid microgametes and macrogametes. Such gametes can fuse within the mosquito to form a diploid (2N) plasmodium zygote, the only diploid stage in the life cycle of these parasites. The zygote can undergo another round of chromosome replication to form an ookinete (4N) (see Figure: Life cycle of plasmodium). The ookinete that differentiates from the zygote is a highly mobile stage that invades the mosquito midgut. The ookinetes can undergo meiosis involving two meiotic divisions leading to the release of haploid sporozoites (see Figure). The sporozoite is an elongated crescent-shaped invasive stage. These sporozoites may migrate to the mosquito's salivary glands and can enter a human host when the mosquito takes a blood meal. The sporozoite then can move to the human host liver and infect hepatocytes.

The profile of genes encoded by plasmodium that are employed in meiosis has some overlap with the profile of genes employed in meiosis in other more well-studied organisms, but is more divergent and is lacking some components of the meiotic process found in other organisms. During plasmodium meiosis, recombination occurs between homologous chromosomes as in other organisms.

== Interaction with human immune system ==
=== Immune response ===
A single anopheline mosquito can transmit hundreds of P. falciparum sporozoites in a single bite under experimental conditions, but, in nature, the number is generally less than 80. The sporozoites do not enter the bloodstream directly, but rather remain in the skin for two to three hours. About 15–20% of the sporozoites enter the lymphatic system, where they activate dendritic cells, which send them for destruction by T lymphocytes (CD8+ T cells). At 48 hours after infection, Plasmodium-specific CD8+ T cells can be detected in the lymph nodes connected to the skin cells. Most of the sporozoites remaining in the skin tissue are subsequently killed by the innate immune system. The sporozoite glycoprotein specifically activates mast cells. The mast cells then produce signaling molecules such as TNFα and MIP-2, which activate cell eaters (professional phagocytes) such as neutrophils and macrophages.

Only a small number (0.5-5%) of sporozoites enter the bloodstream into the liver. In the liver, the activated CD8+ T cells from the lymph bind the sporozoites through the circumsporozoite protein (CSP). Antigen presentation by dendritic cells in the skin tissue to T cells is also a crucial process. From this stage onward, the parasites produce different proteins that help suppress communication of the immune cells. Even at the height of the infection, when red blood cells (RBCs) are ruptured, the immune signals are not strong enough to activate macrophages or natural killer cells.

=== Immune system evasion ===
Although P. falciparum is easily recognized by the human immune system while in the bloodstream, it evades immunity by producing over 2,000 cell membrane antigens. The initial infective stage sporozoites produce circumsporozoite protein (CSP), which binds to hepatocytes. Binding to and entering into the hepatocytes is aided by thrombospondin-related anonymous protein (TRAP). TRAP and other secretory proteins (including sporozoite microneme protein essential for cell traversal 1, SPECT1 and SPECT2) from microneme allow the sporozoite to move through the blood, avoiding immune cells and penetrating hepatocytes.

During erythrocyte invasion, merozoites release merozoite cap protein-1 (MCP1), apical membrane antigen 1 (AMA1), erythrocyte-binding antigens (EBAs), myosin A tail domain interacting protein (MTIP), and merozoite surface proteins (MSPs). Of these MSPs, MSP1 and MSP2 are primarily responsible for avoiding immune cells. The virulence of P. falciparum is mediated by erythrocyte membrane proteins, which are produced by the schizonts and trophozoites inside the erythrocytes and are displayed on the erythrocyte membrane. Plasmodium falciparum erythrocyte membrane protein 1 (PfEMP1) is the most important, capable of acting as both an antigen and an adhesion molecule. P. falciparum and other related parasites share large var gene families. These var gene families actually encode the PfEMP1 surface protein. The PfEMP1 protein causes infected red blood cells to adhere to blood vessel walls, which keeps the parasite from being flushed from the spleen. Other species of malaria lack these large var gene families which is why P. falciparum causes the most severe life-threatening malaria.

== Pathogenicity ==
The clinical symptoms of falciparum malaria are produced by the rupture and destruction of erythrocytes by the merozoites. High fever, called paroxysm, is the most basic indication. The fever has a characteristic cycle of hot stage, cold stage, and sweating stages. Since each erythrocytic schizogony takes a cycle of 48 hours, i.e., two days, the febrile symptom appears every third day. This is the reason the infection is classically named tertian malignant fever (tertian, a derivative of a Latin word that means "third"). The most common symptoms are fever (>92% of cases), chills (79%), headaches (70%), and sweating (64%). Dizziness, malaise, muscle pain, abdominal pain, nausea, vomiting, mild diarrhea, and dry cough are also generally associated. High heart rate, jaundice, pallor, orthostatic hypotension, enlarged liver, and enlarged spleen are also diagnosed.

The insoluble β-hematin crystal, haemozoin, produced from the digestion of haemoglobin of the red blood cells (RBCs) is the main agent that affects body organs. Acting as a blood toxin, haemozoin-containing RBCs cannot be attacked by phagocytes during the immune response to malaria. The phagocytes can ingest free haemozoins liberated after the rupture of RBCs by which they are induced to initiate chains of inflammatory reaction that result in increased fever. It is the haemozoin that is deposited in body organs such as the spleen and liver, as well as in kidneys and lungs, to cause their enlargement and discolouration. Because of this, haemozoin is also known as malarial pigment.

Unlike other forms of malaria, which show regular periodicity of fever, falciparum, though exhibiting a 48-hour cycle, usually presents as irregular bouts of fever. This difference is due to the ability of P. falciparum merozoites to invade a large number of RBCs sequentially without coordinated intervals, which is not seen in other malarial parasites. P. falciparum is therefore responsible for almost all severe human illnesses and deaths due to malaria, in a condition called pernicious or complicated or severe malaria. Complicated malaria occurs more commonly in children under age 5, and sometimes in pregnant women (a condition specifically called pregnancy-associated malaria). Women become susceptible to severe malaria during their first pregnancy. Susceptibility to severe malaria is reduced in subsequent pregnancies due to increased antibody levels against variant surface antigens that appear on infected erythrocytes. But increased immunity in the mother increases susceptibility to malaria in newborn babies.

P. falciparum works via sequestration, a process by which group of infected RBCs are clustered, which is not exhibited by any other species of malarial parasites. The mature schizonts change the surface properties of infected erythrocytes, causing them to stick to blood vessel walls (cytoadherence). This leads to obstruction of the microcirculation and results in dysfunction of multiple organs, such as the brain in cerebral malaria.

Cerebral malaria is the most dangerous condition of any malarial infection and the most severe form of neurological disorders. According to the WHO definition, the clinical symptom is indicated by coma and diagnosis by a high level of merozoites in the peripheral blood samples. It is the deadliest form of malaria, and to it are attributed to 0.2 million to over a million annual deaths throughout the ages. Most deaths are of children of below 5 years of age. It occurs when the merozoites invade the brain and cause brain damage of varying degrees. Death is caused by oxygen deprivation (hypoxia) due to inflammatory cytokine production and vascular leakage induced by the merozoites. Among the surviving individuals, persistent medical conditions such as neurological impairment, intellectual disability, and behavioural problems exist. Among them, epilepsy is the most common condition, and cerebral malaria is the leading cause of acquired epilepsy among African children.

The reappearance of falciparum symptom, a phenomenon called recrudescence, is often seen in survivors. Recrudescence can occur even after successful antimalarial medication. It may take a few months or even several years. In some individuals, it takes as long as three years. In isolated cases, the duration can reach or exceed 10 years. It is also a common incident among pregnant women.

== Distribution and epidemiology ==
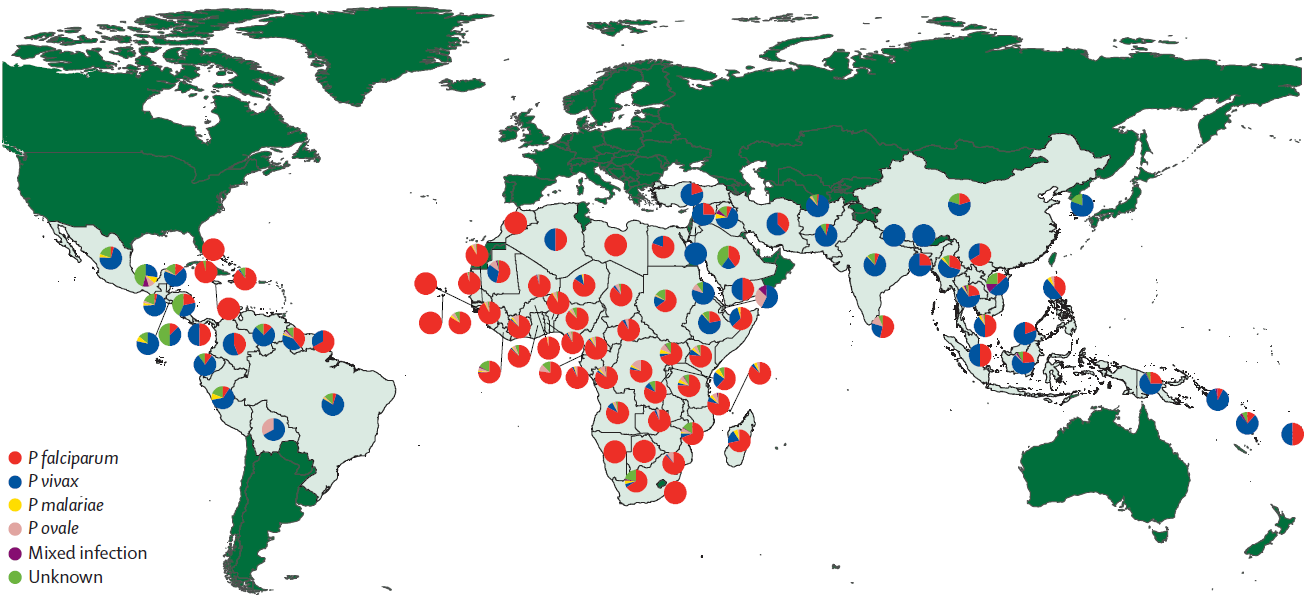
Relative incidence of Plasmodium species by country of origin for imported cases to non-endemic countries, showing P. falciparum (red) predominating in areas including Africa and the Caribbean.

The Z(T) normalized index of temperature suitability for P. falciparum displayed by week across an average year.

P. falciparum is endemic in 84 countries, and is found in all permanently inhabited continents except Europe. Historically, it was present in most European countries, but improved health conditions led to the disappearance in the early 20th century. The only European country where it used to be historically prevalent, and from where we got the name malaria, Italy had been declared malaria-eradicated country. In 1947, the US government launched the National Malaria Eradication Program, and following, an anti-mosquito campaign was implemented using DDT. The WHO declared Italy free of malaria in 1970.

There were an estimated 263 million cases of malaria worldwide in 2023, resulting in an estimated 597,000 deaths. The infection is most prevalent in Africa, where 95% of malaria deaths occur. Children under five years of age are most affected, and 67% of malaria deaths occurred in this age group. 80% of the infection is found in Sub-Saharan Africa, 7% in South-East Asia, and 2% in the Eastern Mediterranean. Nigeria has the highest incidence, with 27% of the total global cases. Outside Africa, India has the highest incidence, with 4.5% of the global burden. Europe is regarded as a malaria-free region. Historically, the parasite and its disease had been most well-known in Europe. But medical programmes since the early 20th century, such as insecticide spraying, drug therapy, and environmental engineering, resulted in complete eradication in the 1970s. It is estimated that approximately 2.4 billion people are at constant risk of infection.

== Treatment ==
=== History ===
In 1640, Huan del Vego first employed a tincture of cinchona bark for treating malaria; the native Indians of Peru and Ecuador had been using it even earlier for treating fevers. Thompson (1650) introduced this "Jesuits' bark" to England. Its first recorded use there was by John Metford of Northampton in 1656. Morton (1696) presented the first detailed description of the clinical picture of malaria and of its treatment with cinchona. Gize (1816) studied the extraction of crystalline quinine from the cinchona bark and Pelletier and Caventou (1820) in France extracted pure quinine alkaloids, which they named quinine and cinchonine. The total synthesis of quinine was achieved by American chemists R.B. Woodward and W.E. Doering in 1944. Woodward received the Nobel Prize in Chemistry in 1965.

Attempts to make synthetic antimalarials began in 1891. Atabrine, developed in 1933, was used widely throughout the Pacific in World War II, but was unpopular because of its adverse effects. In the late 1930s, the Germans developed chloroquine, which went into use in the North African campaigns. Creating a secret military project called Project 523, Mao Zedong encouraged Chinese scientists to find new antimalarials after seeing the casualties in the Vietnam War. Tu Youyou discovered artemisinin in the 1970s from sweet wormwood (Artemisia annua). This drug became known to Western scientists in the late 1980s and early 1990s and is now a standard treatment. Tu won the Nobel Prize in Physiology or Medicine in 2015.

=== Uncomplicated malaria ===
According to WHO guidelines 2010, artemisinin-based combination therapies (ACTs) are the recommended first-line antimalarial treatments for uncomplicated malaria caused by P. falciparum. WHO recommends combinations such as artemether/lumefantrine, artesunate/amodiaquine, artesunate/mefloquine, artesunate/sulfadoxine/pyrimethamine, and dihydroartemisinin/piperaquine.

The choice of ACT is based on the level of resistance to the constituents in the combination. Artemisinin and its derivatives are not appropriate for monotherapy. As a second-line antimalarial treatment, when initial treatment does not work, an alternative ACT known to be effective in the region is recommended, such as artesunate plus tetracycline or doxycycline or clindamycin, and quinine plus tetracycline or doxycycline or clindamycin. Any of these combinations is to be given for 7 days. For pregnant women, the recommended first-line treatment during the first trimester is quinine plus clindamycin for 7 days. Artesunate plus clindamycin for 7 days is indicated if this treatment fails. For travellers returning to nonendemic countries, atovaquone/proguanil, artemether/lumefantrineany and quinine plus doxycycline or clindamycin are recommended.

=== Severe malaria ===
For adults, intravenous (IV) or intramuscular (IM) artesunate is recommended. Quinine is an acceptable alternative if parenteral artesunate is not available.

For children, especially in the malaria-endemic areas of Africa, artesunate IV or IM, quinine (IV infusion or divided IM injection), and artemether IM are recommended.

Parenteral antimalarials should be administered for a minimum of 24 hours, irrespective of the patient's ability to tolerate oral medication earlier. Thereafter, complete treatment is recommended including a complete course of ACT or quinine plus clindamycin or doxycycline.

=== Vaccination ===
RTS,S is the only candidate for the malaria vaccine to have gone through clinical trials. Analysis of the results of the phase III trial (conducted between 2011 and 2016) revealed a rather low efficacy (20-39% depending on age, with up to 50% in 5–17-month aged babies), indicating that the vaccine will not lead to full protection and eradication.

On October 6, 2021, the World Health Organization recommended malaria vaccination for children at risk.

== Cancer ==
The International Agency for Research on Cancer (IARC) has classified malaria due to P. falciparum as a Group 2A carcinogen, meaning that the parasite is probably a cancer-causing agent in humans. Its association with a blood cell (lymphocyte) cancer called Burkitt's lymphoma is established. Burkitt's lymphoma was discovered by Denis Burkitt in 1958 by African children, and he later speculated that the cancer was likely due to certain infectious diseases. The geographic distribution of endemic Burkitt's lymphoma, concentrated in equatorial Africa and Papua New Guinea, closely mirrors regions of holoendemic P. falciparum transmission, providing early epidemiological evidence of a link between malaria and the cancer. In 1964, a virus, later called Epstein–Barr virus (EBV) after the discoverers, was identified from the cancer cells. The virus was subsequently proved to be the direct cancer agent and is now classified as Group 1 carcinogen.

In 1989, it was realised that EBV requires other infections such as malaria to cause lymphocyte transformation. It was reported that the incidence of Burkitt's lymphoma decreased with effective treatment of malaria over several years. The actual role played by P. falciparum remained unclear for the next two-and-half decades. EBV had been known to induce lymphocytes to become cancerous using its viral proteins (antigens such as EBNA-1, EBNA-2, LMP1, and LMP2A). From 2014, it became clear that P. falciparum contributes to the development of the lymphoma. P. falciparum-infected erythrocytes directly bind to B lymphocytes through the CIDR1α domain of PfEMP1. This binding activates toll-like receptors (TLR7 and TLR10) causing continuous activation of lymphocytes to undergo proliferation and differentiation into plasma cells, thereby increasing the secretion of IgM and cytokines. This, in turn, activates an enzyme called activation-induced cytidine deaminase (AID), which tends to cause mutation in the DNA (by double-strand break) of EBV-infected lymphocytes. The damaged DNA undergoes uncontrolled replication, thus making the cell cancerous.

== Influence on the human genome ==
The high mortality and morbidity caused by P. falciparum has placed great selective pressure on the human genome. Several genetic factors provide some resistance to Plasmodium infection, including sickle cell trait, thalassaemia traits, glucose-6-phosphate dehydrogenase deficiency, pyruvate kinase deficiency, and the absence of Duffy antigens on red blood cells. E. A. Beet, a doctor working in Southern Rhodesia (now Zimbabwe) had observed in 1948 that sickle-cell disease was related to a lower rate of malaria infections. This suggestion was reiterated by J. B. S. Haldane in 1948, who suggested that thalassaemia might provide similar protection. This hypothesis has since been confirmed and extended to hemoglobin E and hemoglobin C.

== See also ==
- Malaria Atlas Project
- List of parasites (human)
- UCSC Malaria Genome Browser
