= Plasmodium helical interspersed subtelomeric protein =

Plasmodium RESA, N-terminal
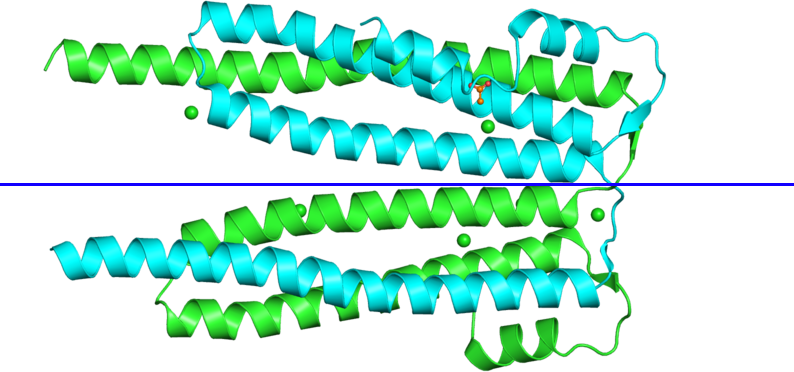

Identifiers
- Symbol: PRESAN
- Pfam: PF09687
- InterPro: IPR019111
- CATH: 4jle
Available protein structures:
- PDB: IPR019111 PF09687 (ECOD; PDBsum)
- AlphaFold: IPR019111; PF09687
- Also IPR006526. The structure is chain-swapped: each side of the blue line is a "solution" monomer.

The Plasmodium helical interspersed subtelomeric proteins (PHIST) or ring-infected erythrocyte surface antigens (RESA) are a family of protein domains found in the malaria-causing Plasmodium species. It was initially identified as a short four-helical conserved region in the single-domain export proteins, but the identification of this part associated with a DnaJ domain in P. falciparum RESA (named after the ring stage of the parasite) has led to its reclassification as the RESA N-terminal domain. This domain has been classified into three subfamilies, PHISTa, PHISTb, and PHISTc.

The PHIST proteins are exported to the cytoplasm of the infected erythrocyte. The human malaria parasites P. falciparum and P. vivax have shown a lineage-specific expansion of proteins with this domain. Of the two PHIST genes in the mouse parasite P. berghei, only one is required for infection. The PHIST domain folds into three long helices (forming a bundle) and two smaller N-terminal helices, and is monomeric in solution. It binds PfEMP1 ATS C-terminus and plays a role in "knob" formation.

== RESA ==
Ring-infected erythrocyte surface antigen

Identifiers
- Organism: Plasmodium falciparum FC27/Papua New Guinea
- Symbol: RESA
- Alt. symbols: Pf155, RESA-1
- Orthologs: OMA: entry
- UniProt: P13830
Search for
- Structures: Swiss-model
- Domains: InterPro

The full RESA protein in P. falciparum also contains a few other domains, namely the DnaJ domain and the DnaJ-associated X domain. A part of the X-domain, RESA/P13830_{663-670}, appears to bind and reinforce spectrin cytoskeleton so that each erythrocyte only hosts one parasite.

P. falciparum isolate 3D7 encodes three RESA-family proteins, RESA-1 (P13830/Q8I0U6/PF3D7_0102200), RESA-2 (M91672.1/UPI0000084FE4/PF3D7_1149500), RESA-3 (Q8IHN1/PF3D7_1149200). RESA-2 is usually considered a transcribed pseudogene due to a premature stop codon. However, a missense mutation T1526G or T1526C in RESA-2 that removes this stop codon is commly found. It is associated with increased severity of disease.
