= Mynx vascular closure device =

Medical device

The Mynx vascular closure device is an extravascular vascular closure device (VCD) whose deployment system is designed to minimize the discomfort commonly associated with closing the small hole in the artery following catheterization procedure. The device is manufactured by AccessClosure, Inc., a medical device company located in Mountain View, California.

== History ==
The Mynx received FDA Premarket Approval (PMA) in May 2007.

== Device description ==
The device uses a soft, sponge-like sealant material to close the small hole in the femoral artery. The sealant works by rapidly absorbing blood and fluids around the puncture site, swelling in size and covering the hole. This seals the hole and stops the bleeding.

The sealant material consists of polyethylene glycol (PEG), a water-soluble, non-thrombogenic, conformable, bio-inert polymer. PEG has an established safety profile and various forms of PEG are commonly used in a range of consumer and medical products including toothpaste, skin cream and lubricant eye drops.

== Procedure ==
The device utilizes a gentle, extravascular deployment method, which avoids cinching or tugging of the artery by placing the sealant on the outside of the artery.

The procedure has been described in medical literature as causing little to no pain for the vast majority of patients.

The device utilizes the existing 5, 6 or 7 French procedural sheath, eliminating the need for a sheath exchange. This avoids potential tissue tract expansion, which can cause tissue trauma and oozing, a post-procedure hassle to the patient and nursing staff, often resulting in longer bed rest for the patient and potentially delaying ambulation and discharge.

As the sealant is placed on the outside of the artery, it is exposed to blood and subcutaneous fluids. The sealant rapidly expands, covering the hole in the artery and conforming to the tissue tract, producing a durable hemostasis.

This extravascular placement of the sealant avoids leaving behind an intravascular component, which can compromise blood flow and, in rare circumstances, embolize, requiring surgical repair.

The sealant fully dissolves within 30 days through hydrolysis.

== Sealant ==
The sealant avoids initiating platelet activation or an abnormal inflammatory response, and does not generate fibrous scar tissue. In addition, the porous characteristics of the sealant create a platform for natural clot formation and facilitate tissue healing.
