= Plasmodium falciparum erythrocyte membrane protein 1 =

PfEMP1, N-terminal segment

Identifiers
- Symbol: NTS
- Pfam: PF15447
- InterPro: IPR029210
Available protein structures:
- PDB: IPR029210 PF15447 (ECOD; PDBsum)
- AlphaFold: IPR029210; PF15447

PfEMP DBL domain

Identifiers
- Symbol: PFEMP
- Pfam: PF03011
- InterPro: IPR004258
- CATH: 2yk0A03
Available protein structures:
- PDB: IPR004258 PF03011 (ECOD; PDBsum)
- AlphaFold: IPR004258; PF03011

PfEMP CIDR1γ

Identifiers
- Symbol: CIDR1_gamma
- Pfam: PF18562
- InterPro: IPR041480
Available protein structures:
- PDB: IPR041480 PF18562 (ECOD; PDBsum)
- AlphaFold: IPR041480; PF18562

PfEMP1, acidic terminal segment

Identifiers
- Symbol: ATS
- Pfam: PF15445
- InterPro: IPR029211
Available protein structures:
- PDB: IPR029211 PF15445 (ECOD; PDBsum)
- AlphaFold: IPR029211; PF15445

Plasmodium falciparum erythrocyte membrane protein 1 (PfEMP1) is a family of proteins present on the membrane surface of red blood cells (RBCs or erythrocytes) that are infected by the malarial parasite Plasmodium falciparum. PfEMP1 is synthesized during the parasite's blood stage (erythrocytic schizogony) inside the RBC, during which the clinical symptoms of falciparum malaria are manifested. Acting as both an antigen and adhesion protein, it is thought to play a key role in the high level of virulence associated with P. falciparum. It was discovered in 1984 when it was reported that infected RBCs had unusually large-sized cell membrane proteins, and these proteins had antibody-binding (antigenic) properties. An elusive protein, its chemical structure and molecular properties were revealed only after a decade, in 1995. It is now established that there is not one but a large family of PfEMP1 proteins, genetically regulated (encoded) by a group of about 60 genes called var. Each P. falciparum is able to switch on and off specific var genes to produce a functionally different protein, thereby evading the host's immune system. RBCs carrying PfEMP1 on their surface stick to endothelial cells, which facilitates further binding with uninfected RBCs (through the processes of sequestration and rosetting), ultimately helping the parasite to both spread to other RBCs as well as bringing about the fatal symptoms of P. falciparum malaria.

== Introduction ==
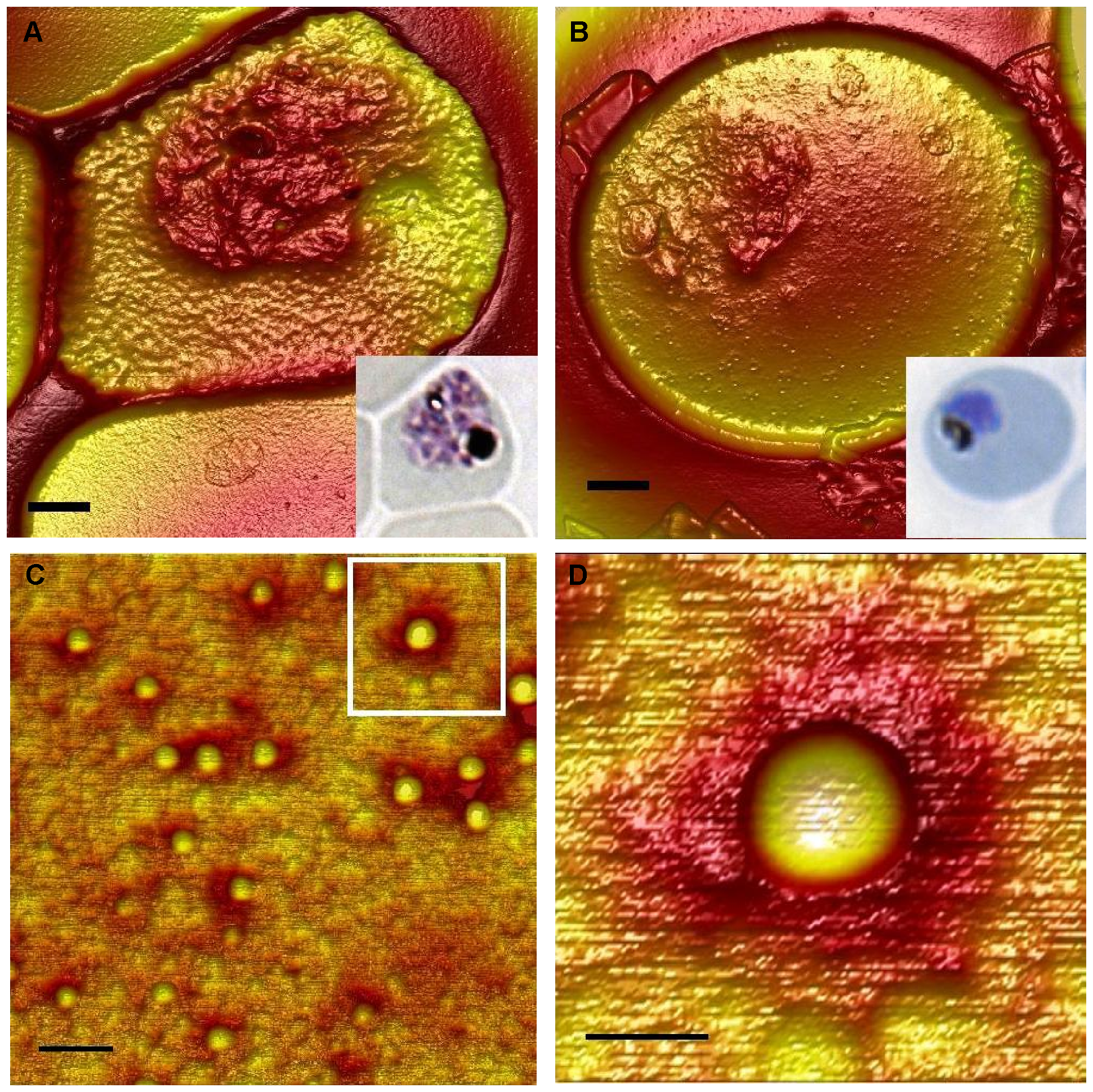
Images of RBCs infected by P. falciparum using atomic force microscopy. (A) An early schizont with cluster of knobs at the center. Scale bar = 1 μm. Inset is the same image under light microscope. (B) A young trophozoite with knobs. Scale bar = 1 μm. (C) A close up of the cell membrane showing individual knobs. Scale bar = 200 nm. (D) A close up of a single knob. Scale bar = 75 nm.

Malaria is the deadliest among infectious diseases, accounting for approximately 429,000 human deaths in 2015 as of the latest estimate by the World Health Organization. In humans, malaria can be caused by five Plasmodium parasites, namely P. falciparum, P. vivax, P. malariae, P. ovale and P. knowlesi. P. falciparum is the most dangerous species, attributed to >99% of malaria's death toll, with 70% of these deaths occurring in children under the age of five years. The parasites are transmitted through the bites of female mosquitos (of the species of Anopheles). Before invading the RBCs and causing the symptoms of malaria, the parasites first multiply in the liver. The daughter parasites called merozoites then only infect the RBCs. They undergo structural development inside the RBCs, becoming trophozoites and schizonts. It is during this period that malarial symptoms are produced.

Unlike RBCs infected by other Plasmodium species, P. falciparum-infected RBCs had been known to spontaneously stick together. By the early 1980s, it was established that when the parasite (both the trophozoite and schizont forms) enters the blood stream and infects RBCs, the infected cells form knobs on their surface. Then they become sticky, and get attached to the walls (endothelium) of the blood vessels through a process called cytoadhesion, or cytoadherence. Such attachment favours binding with and accumulation of other RBCs. This process is known as sequestration. It is during this condition that the parasites induce an immune response (antigen-antibody reaction) and evade destruction in the spleen. Although the process and significance of sequestration were described in detail by two Italian physicians Amico Bignami and Ettore Marchiafava in the early 1890s, it took a century to discover the actual factor for the stickiness and virulence.

== Discovery ==
PfEMP1 was discovered by Russell J. Howard and his colleagues at the US National Institutes of Health in 1984. Using the techniques of radioiodination and immunoprecipitation, they found a unique but yet unknown antigen from P. falciparum-infected RBCs that appeared to cause binding with other cells. Since the antigenic protein could only be detected in infected cells, they asserted that the protein was produced by the malarial parasite, and not by RBCs. The antigen was large and appeared to be different in size in different strains of P. falciparum obtained from night monkey (Aotus). In one strain, called Camp (from Malaysia), the antigen was found to have a molecular size of approximately 285 kDa; while in the other, called St. Lucia (from El Salvador), it was approximately 260 kDa. Both antigens bind to cultured skin cancer (melanoma) cells. But the researchers failed to confirm whether or not the protein actually was an adhesion molecule to the wall of blood vessels. Later in the same year, they found out that the unknown antigen was associated only with RBCs having small lumps called knobs on their surface. The first human RBC antigen was reported in 1986. Howard's team found that the antigens from Gambian children, who were suffering from falciparum malaria, were similar to those from the RBCs of night monkey. They determined that the molecular sizes of the proteins ranged from 250 to 300 kDa.

In 1987, they discovered another type of surface antigen from the same Camp and St. Lucia strains of malarial parasites. This was also a large-sized protein of about 300 kDa, but quite different from the antigens reported in 1984. The new protein was unable to bind to melanoma cells and present only inside the cell. Hence, they named the earlier protein Plasmodium falciparum erythrocyte membrane protein 1 (PfEMP1), to distinguish it from the newly identified Plasmodium falciparum erythrocyte membrane protein 2 (PfEMP2). The distinction was confirmed the next year, with an additional information that PfEMP1 is relatively less in number.

Although some of the properties of PfEMP1 were firmly established, the protein was difficult to isolate due to its low occurrence. Five years after its discovery, one of the original researchers Irwin Sherman began to doubt the existence of PfEMP1 as a unique protein. He argued that the antigen could be merely a surface protein of RBCs that changes upon infection with malarial parasites. A consensus was achieved in 1995 following the identification (by cloning) of the gene for PfEMP1. The discovery of the genes was independently reported by Howard's team and two other teams at NIH. Howard's team identified two genes for PfEMP1, and recombinant protein products of these genes were shown to have antigenic and adhesive properties. They further affirmed that PfEMP1 is the key molecule in the ability of P. falciparum to evade the host's immune system. Joseph D. Smith and others showed that PfEMP1 is actually a large family of proteins encoded by a multigene family called var. The gene products can bind to a variety of receptors including those on endothelial cells. Xin-Zhuan Su and others showed that there could be more than 50 var genes which are distributed on different chromosomes of the malarial parasite.

== Structure ==
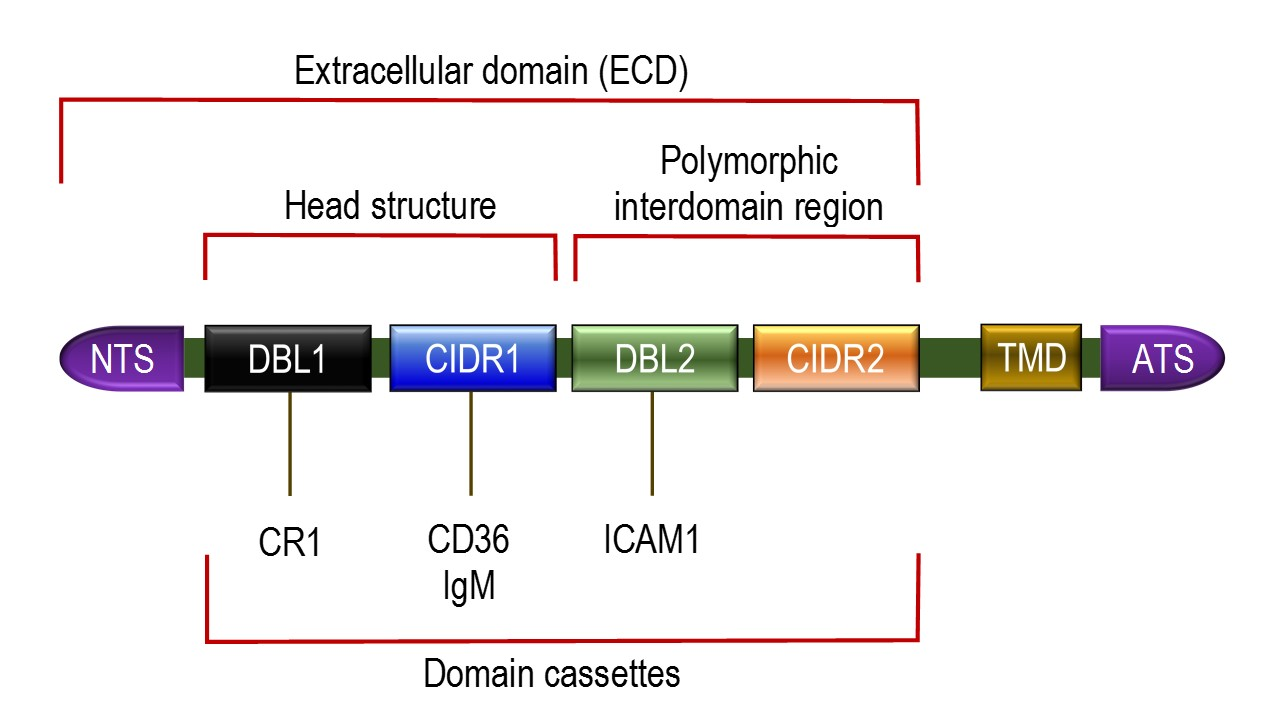
Typical structure of PfEMP1. NTS = N terminal segment. TMD = transmembrane domain. ATS = intracellular acidic terminal segment.

PfEMP1 is a large family of proteins having high molecular weights ranging from 200 to 350 kDa. The wide range of molecular size reflects extreme variation in the amino acid composition of the proteins. But all the PfEMP1 proteins can be described as having three basic structural components, namely, an extracellular domain (ECD), a transmembrane domain (TMD) and an intracellular acidic terminal segment (ATS). The extracellular domain is fully exposed on the cell surface, and is the most variable region. It consists of a number of sub-domains, including a short and conserved N terminal segment (NTS) at the outermost region, followed by a highly variable Duffy-binding-like (DBL) domain, sometimes a Ca^{2+}-binding C2 domain, and then one or two cysteine-rich interdomain regions (CIDRs).

Duffy-binding-like domains are so named because of their similarity to the Duffy binding proteins of P. vivax and P. knowlesi. There are six variant types of DBL, named DBLα, DBLβ, DBLγ, DBLδ, DBLε and DBLζ. CIDR is also divided into three classes: CIDRα, CIDRβ and CIDRγ. Both DBL and CIDR have an additional type called PAM, so named because of their specific involvement in pregnancy-associated malaria (PAM). In spite of the diverse DBL and CIDR proteins, the extracellular amino terminal region is partly conserved, consisting of about 60 amino acids of NTS, one each of DBLα and CIDR1 proteins in tandem. This semi-conserved DBLα-CIDR1 region is called the head structure. The last CIDR region joins the TMD, which is embedded in the cell membrane. The TMD and ATS are highly conserved among different PfEMP1s, and their structures have been solved using solution NMR (PDB: 2LKL).

The head structure is followed by a variable combination of diverse DBL and CIDR proteins, and in many cases along with C2. This variation gives rise to different types of PfEMP1. The DBL-CIDR combination in a particular type of PfEMP1 protein is never random, but organized into specific sequences known as domain cassettes. In some domain cassettes, there are only two or few DBL domains and CIDR domains, but in others they cover the entire length of the PfEMP1. These differences are responsible for different binding capacity among different PfEMP1s. For instance, among the most well-known types, VAR3 (earlier called type 3 PfEMP1) is the smallest, consisting of only NTS with DBL1α and DBL2ε domains in the ECD. Its molecular size is approximately 150 kDa. In domain cassette (DC) 4 type, the ECD is made up of three domains DBLα_{1.1/1.4}, CIDRα_{1.6} and DBLβ_{3}. The DBLβ_{3} domain contains a binding site for intercellular adhesion molecule 1 (ICAM1). This is particularly implicated with the development of brain infection. VAR2CSA is atypical in having a single domain cassette that consists of three N terminal DBL_{PAM} domains followed by three DBLε domains and one CIDR_{PAM}. The seven domains always occur together. The usual NTS is absent. The protein specifically binds to chondroitin sulphate A (CSA); hence the name VAR2CSA.

== Synthesis and transport ==
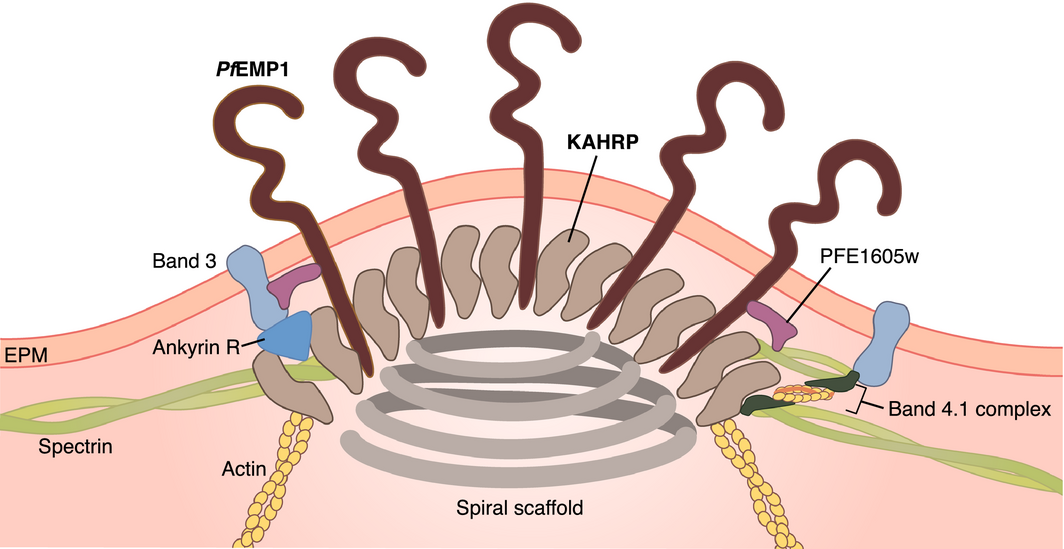
Model of a knob structure of P. falciparum-infected RBC showing attachment of PfEMP1.

The PfEMP1 proteins are regulated and produced (encoded) by about 60 different var genes, but an individual P. falciparum would switch on only a single var gene at a time to produce only one type of PfEMP. The var genes are distributed in two exons. Exon 1 encodes amino acids of the highly variable ECD, while exon 2 encodes those of the conserved TMD and ATS. Based on their location in the chromosome and sequence, the var genes are generally classified into three major groups, A, B, and C, and two intermediate groups, B/A and B/C; or sometimes simply into five classes, upsA, upsB, upsC, upsD, and upsE respectively. Groups A and B are found towards the terminal end (subtelomeric) region of the chromosome, while group C is in the central (centromeric) region.

Once the PfEMP1 protein is fully synthesized (translated), it is carried to the cytoplasm towards the RBC membrane. The NTS is crucial for such directional movement. Within the cytoplasm, the newly synthesized protein is attached to a Golgi-like membranous vesicle called the Maurer's cleft. Inside the Maurer's clefts is a family of proteins called Plasmodium helical interspersed subtelomeric (PHIST) proteins. Of the PHIST proteins, PFI1780w and PFE1605w bind the intracellular ATS of PfEMP1 during transport to the RBC membrane.

The PfEMP1 molecule is deposited at the RBC membrane at the knobs. These knobs are easily identified as conspicuous bumps on the infected RBCs from the early trophozoite stage onward. The malarial parasite cannot induce its virulence on RBCs without knobs. As many as 10,000 knobs are distributed throughout the surface of a mature infected RBC, and each knob is 50-80 nm in diameter. The export of pfEMP1 from Maurer's cleft to RBC membrane is mediated by binding of another protein produced by the parasite called knob-associated histidine-rich protein (KAHRP). KAHRP enhances the structural rigidity of infected RBC and adhesion of PfEMP1 on the knobs. It is also directly responsible for forming knobs, as indicated by the fact that kahrp gene-deficient malarial parasites do not form knobs. To form a knob, KAHRP aggregates several membrane skeletal proteins of the host RBC, such as spectrin, actin, ankyrin R, and spectrin–actin band 4.1 complex. Upon arrival at the knob, PfEMP1 is attached to the spectrin network using the PHIST proteins.

== Function ==
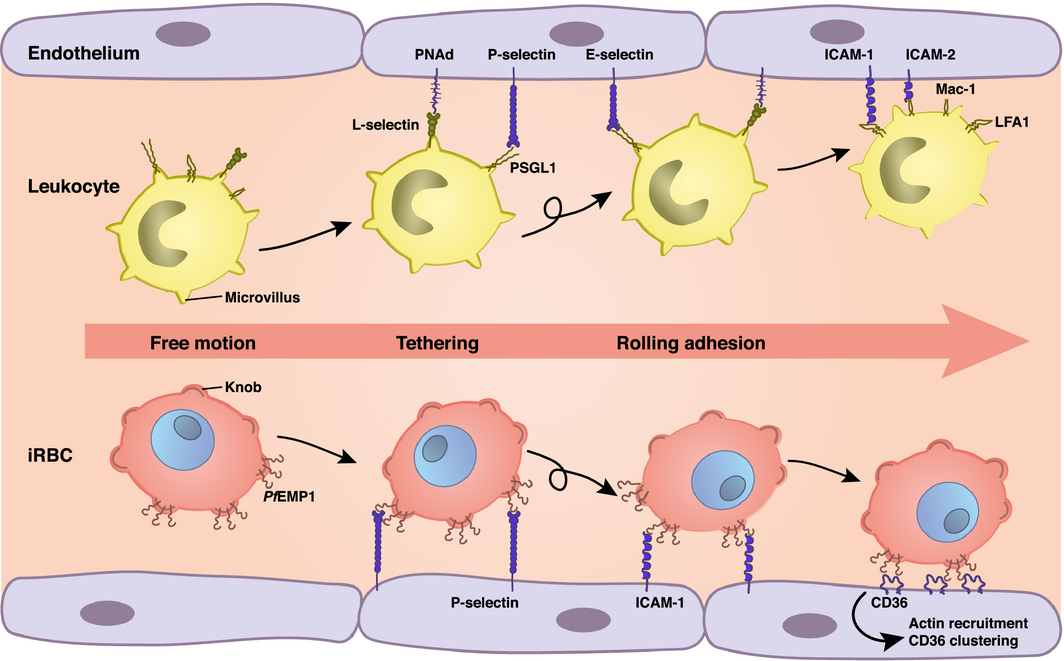
Model of binding of RBC and WBC infected by P. falciparum to endothelial cells.

The primary function of PfEMP1 is to bind and attach RBCs to the wall of the blood vessels. The most important binding properties of P. falciparum known to date are mediated by the head structure of PfEMP1, consisting of DBL domains and CIDRs. DBL domains can bind to a variety of cell receptors including thrombospondin (TSP), complement receptor 1 (CR1), chondroitin sulfate A (CSA), P-selectin, endothelial protein C receptor (EPCR), and heparan sulfate. The DBL domain adjacent to the head structure binds to ICAM-1. CIDRs mainly bind to a large variety of cluster determinant 36 (CD36). These bindings produce the pathogenic characteristics of the parasite, such as sequestration of infected cells in different tissues, invasion of RBCs, and clustering of infected cells by a process called rosetting.

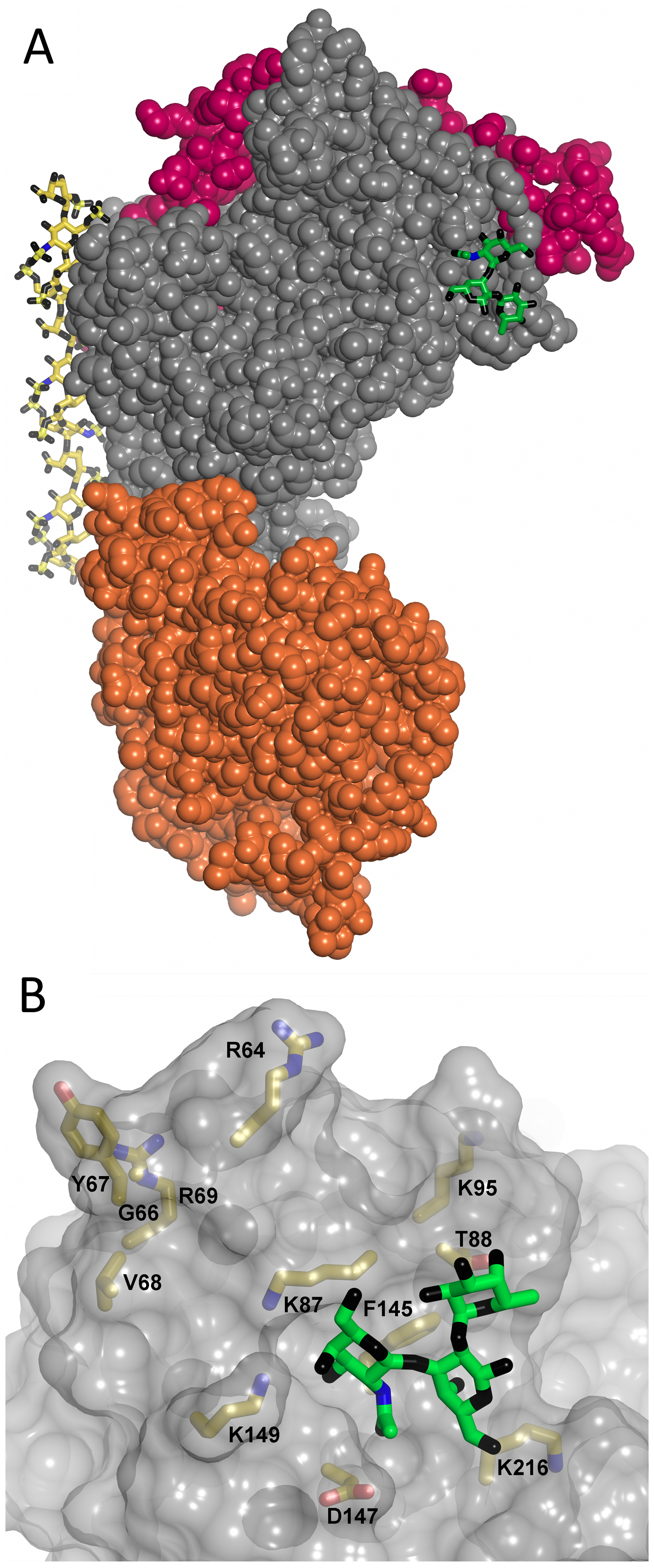
The RBC-binding site of PfEMP1. (A) The head structure (mauve = NTS region, grey = DBL1α1, orange = CIDR1γ) with the docked blood group A (green-blue-black sticks) and heparin (yellow-black sticks) molecules. (B) Detail of the RBC-binding site with bound molecules (yellow = C, blue =N, red = O).

CIDR1 protein in the semi-conserved head structure is the principal and best understood adhesion site of PfEMP1. It binds with CD36 on endothelial cells. Only group B and C proteins are able to bind, and that too with only those having CIDRα2-6 sequence types. On the other hand, group A proteins have either CIDRα1 or CIDRβ/γ/δ, and they are responsible for the most severe condition of malaria. Binding with ICAM-1 is achieved through the DBLβ domain adjacent to the head structure. However, many PfEMP1s having DBLβ domain do not bind to ICAM-1, and it appears that only the DBLβ paired with C2 domain can to bind to ICAM-1. The DBLα-CIDRγ tandem pair is the main factor for rosetting, sticking together the infected RBC with the uninfected cells, and thereby clogging of the blood vessels. This activity is performed through binding with CR1.

The most dangerous malarial infection is in the brain and is called cerebral malaria. In cerebral malaria, the PfEMP1 proteins involved are DC8 and DC13. They are named after the number of domain cassettes they contain, and are capable of binding not only endothelial cells of the brain, but also in different organs including brain, lung, heart, and bone marrow. Initially, it was assumed that PfEMP1 binds to ICAM-1 in the brain, but DC8 and DC13 were found incompatible with ICAM-1. Instead DC8 and DC13 specifically bind to EPCR using CIDRα sub-types such as CIDRα_{1.1}, CIDRα_{1.4}, CIDRα_{1.5} and CIDRα_{1.7}. However, it was later shown that DC13 can bind to both ICAM-1 and EPCR. EPCR is thus a potential vaccine and drug target in cerebral malaria.

VAR2CSA is unique in that it is mostly produced by the placenta during pregnancy (the condition called pregnancy-associated malaria, PAM, or placental malaria). The majority of PAM is therefore due to VAR2SCA. Unlike other PfEMP1, VAR2CSA binds to chondroitin sulfate A present on the vascular endothelium of the placenta. Although its individual domains can bind to CSA, its entire structure is used for complete binding. The major complication in PAM is low-birth-weight babies. However, women who survived the first infection generally develop an effective immune response. In P. falciparum-prevalent regions in Africa, pregnant women are found to contain high levels of antibody (immunoglobulin G, or IgG) against VAR2CSA, which protect them the placenta-attacking malarial parasite. They are noted for giving birth to heavier babies.

== Clinical importance ==
In a normal human immune system, malarial parasite binding to RBCs stimulates the production of antibodies that attack the PfEMP1 molecules. Binding of antibody with PfEMP1 disables the binding properties of DBL domains, causing loss of cell adhesion, and the infected RBC is destroyed. In this scenario, malaria is avoided. However, to evade the host's immune response, different P. falciparum switch on and off different var genes to produce functionally different (antigenically distinct) PfEMP1s. Each variant type of PfEMP1 has different binding property, and thus, is not always recognized by antibodies.

By default, all the var genes in the malarial parasite are inactivated. Activation (gene expression) of var is initiated upon infection of the organs. Further, in each organ only specific var genes are activated. The severity of the infection is determined by the type of organ in which infection occurs, hence, the type of var gene activated. For examples, in the most severe cases of malaria, such as cerebral malaria, only the var genes for the PfEMP1 proteins DC8 and DC13 are switched on. Upon the synthesis of DC8 and DC13, their CIDR_{α1} domains bind to EPCR, which brings about the onset of severe malaria. The abundance of the gene products (transcripts) of these PfEMP1 proteins (specifically the CIDR_{α1} subtype transcripts) directly relates to the severity of the disease. This further indicates that preventing the interaction between CIDR_{α1} and EPCR would be good target for a potential vaccine. In pregnancy-associated malaria, another severe type of falciparum malaria, the gene for VAR2CSA (named var2csa) is activated in the placenta. Binding of VAR2CSA to CSA is the primary cause of premature delivery, death of the foetus and severe anaemia in the mother. This indicates that drugs targeting VAR2CSA will be able to prevent the effects of malaria, and for this reason VAR2CSA is the leading candidate for development of a PAM vaccine.
