= Vascular closure device =

Medical device used to achieve hemostasis of small holes in arteries

Vascular closure devices (VCDs) are medical devices used to achieve hemostasis of the small hole in the artery after a cardiovascular procedure of endovascular surgery requiring a catheterization.

Cardiovascular procedures requiring catheterization include diagnostic procedures that help diagnose diseased blood vessels and interventional procedures such as angioplasty, the placement of a stent and coronary thrombectomy.

During such procedures, a small incision is made in the groin area and a hole is created in the femoral artery to gain access to the artery. This hole is referred to as the access site or puncture site. At the completion of the procedure, the hole needs to be closed. Metal clip-based and suture-based VCDs may reduce time to hemostasis when compared with extrinsic (manual or mechanical) compression. However, no type of VCD has been shown to be more effective or safe than another.

== Goals ==
The main goal of a vascular closure device is to provide rapid hemostasis of the artery as well as reduce access site complications. VCD's also help reduce time to ambulation and time to hospital discharge. In addition, VCDs are more comfortable for the patient compared to manual compression.

== History ==
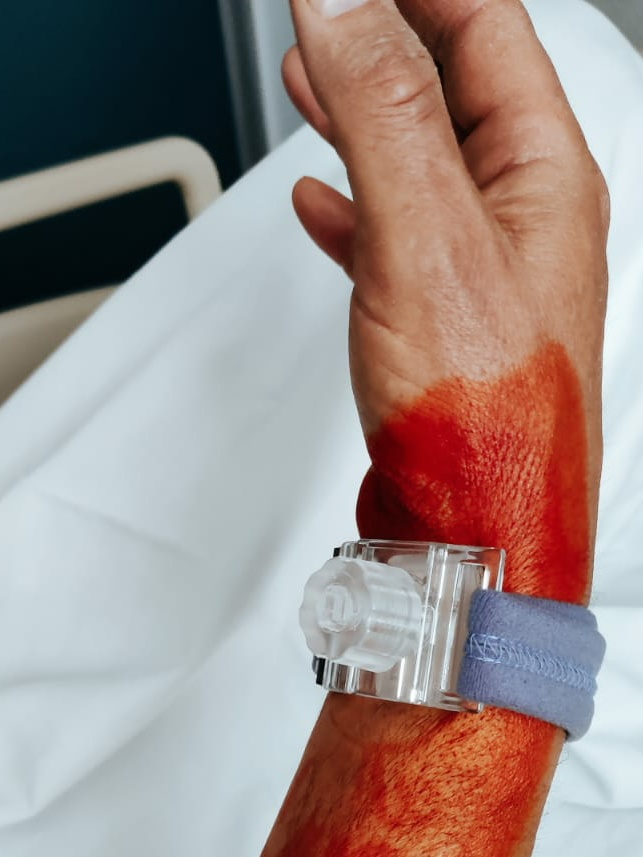
An external vascular closure device of radial artery following a cardiac catheterization. The device allows for gradual release of pressure over the puncture site, reducing patient discomfort, until closure is achieved.

Prior to the development of VCD's, the main method for closing the femoral artery was manual compression. Manual compression involves up to 30 minutes of manual pressure or mechanical clamps applied directly to the patient's groin, which is very painful, followed by up to 8 hours of bed rest in the hospital recovery room.

Vascular closure devices were introduced in the early 1990s in an effort to reduce the time to hemostasis, enable early ambulation and improve patient comfort. Initially, devices focused on technologies involving a suture or a collagen plug. These technologies are effective at closing the hole; however, they often leave an intravascular component in the artery, which can cause complications. In addition, these technologies failed to accurately address patient pain.

More recent methods to close the hole involve the use of novel materials that dissolve over a short period of time, such as polyethylene glycol found in the Mynx vascular closure device. These technologies incorporate a more gentle deployment of the material to the outside of the artery and avoid the use of intravascular components, leaving nothing behind in the artery and consequently improving patient comfort.
