= Parasitophorous vacuole =

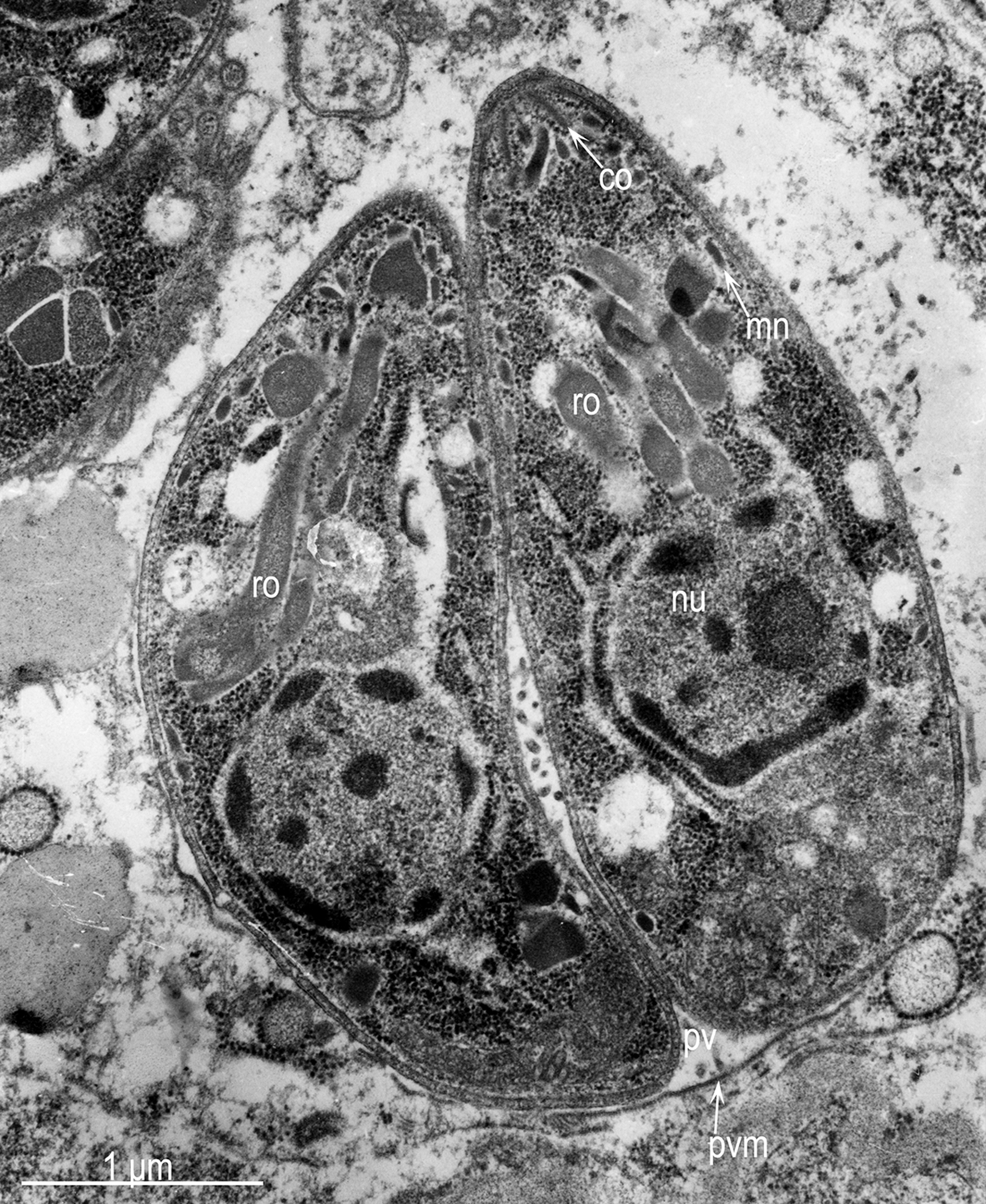
Toxoplasma gondii in a bar-shouldered dove, lung. Two tachyzoites enclosed in a parasitophorous vacuolar membrane (pvm). Note conoid (co), micronemes (mn), rhoptries (ro) with honey-combed contents, and a nucleus (nu) in each tachyzoite. The parasitophorous vacuole has membranous tubules. Transmission electron microscopy.

The parasitophorous vacuole (PV) is a structure produced by apicomplexan parasites in the cells of its host. The PV allows the parasite to develop while protected from the phagolysosomes of the host cell.

The PV is a bubble-like compartment made of plasma membrane; the compartment contains cytoplasm and the parasite. The PV allows the parasite to exist and grow within the cell while protecting the parasite from the host cell defense mechanisms. The PV prevents the acidification of the compartment, the mechanism by which the lysosomes of the host cell would normally destroy an invading parasite. Parasites that form a parasitophorous vacuole as part of their infection process include Plasmodium falciparum, which causes malaria and Toxoplasma gondii, which causes toxoplasmosis.

The parasitophorous vacuole is formed during cell invasion, when the parasite uses part of the membrane of the host cell to form a parasitophorous vacuolar membrane (PVM). The PVM surrounds the intracellular parasite, creating a separate bubble of cytoplasm-filled plasma membrane within the host cell. The rhoptry and the microneme, special secretory organelles found in apicomplexan parasites, play a major role in the formation of the vacuole. The PVM is extensively re-modelled by parasitic proteins. One theory is that the microneme works with the rhoptry and the rhoptry secretes proteins to create the PVM, while the microneme binds to the surface of red blood cells, allowing the parasite to more easily enter into the cell.

The PV is not a true vacuole, but resembles one under the microscope.
