= Merozoite surface protein =

Merozoite Surface Protein-1
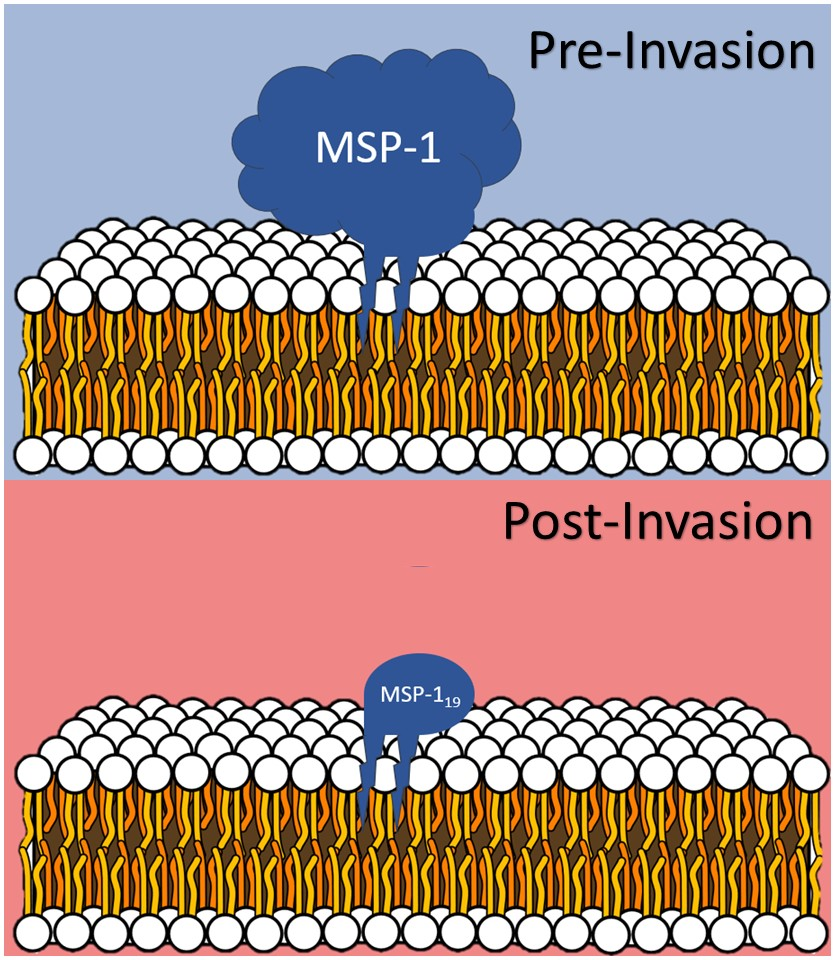
- The MSP-1 complex is attached to the merozoite cell membrane via GPI-anchoring, indicated by the staggered lines penetrating the cell membrane. After red blood cell invasion, the majority of the MSP-1 complex is shed, leaving MSP-1_{19} behind.

Identifiers
- Organism: Plasmodium knowlesi
- Symbol: MSP1
- Alt. symbols: PKH_072850
- Entrez: 7320035
- PDB: 1N1I
- RefSeq (mRNA): XM_002258546.1
- RefSeq (Prot): XP_002258582.1
- UniProt: Q9GSQ9

Other data
- Chromosome: 7: 1.26 - 1.27 Mb
Search for
- Structures: Swiss-model
- Domains: InterPro

Merozoite /ˌmɛrəˈzoʊˌaɪt/ surface proteins are both integral and peripheral membrane proteins found on the surface of a merozoite, an early life cycle stage of a protozoan. Merozoite surface proteins, or MSPs, are important in understanding malaria, a disease caused by protozoans of the genus Plasmodium. During the asexual blood stage of its life cycle, the malaria parasite enters red blood cells to replicate itself, causing the classic symptoms of malaria. These surface protein complexes are involved in many interactions of the parasite with red blood cells and are therefore an important topic of study for scientists aiming to combat malaria.

== Forms ==
The most common form of MSPs are anchored to the merozoite surface with glycophosphatidylinositol, a short glycolipid often used for protein anchoring. Additional forms include integral membrane proteins and peripherally associated proteins, which are found to a lesser extent than glycophosphatidylinositol anchored proteins, or (GPI)-anchored proteins, on the merozoite surface. Merozoite surface proteins 1 and 2 (MSP-1 and MSP-2) are the most abundant (GPI)-anchored proteins on the surface of Plasmodium merozoites.

== Function ==
MSP-1 is synthesized at the very beginning of schizogony, or asexual merozoite reproduction. The merozoite first attaches to a red blood cell using its MSP-1 complex. The MSP-1 complex targets spectrin, a complex on the internal surface of the cell membrane of a red blood cell. The majority of the MSP-1 complex is shed upon entry into the red blood cell, but a small portion of the C-terminus, called MSP-1_{19}, is conserved. The exact role of MSP-1_{19} remains unknown, but it currently serves as a marker for the formation of the food vacuole.

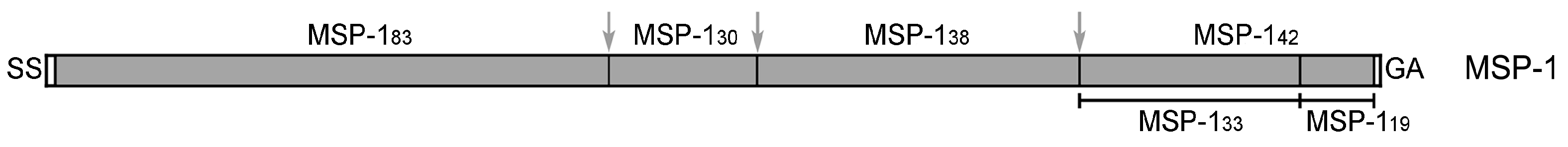
The relative size and location of each segment present on the MSP-1 complex is shown above. SS represents the signal sequence, which is a short sequence present on the N-terminus of new proteins. GA represents the GPI anchor, which is located at the C-terminus of the protein.

The function of the MSP-2 complex is not concrete, but current research suggests it has a role in red blood cell invasion due to its degradation shortly after invasion. MSP- 3, 6, 7 and 9 are peripheral membrane proteins that have been shown to form a complex with MSP-1, but the functions of these proteins are largely unknown.

== Clinical significance ==
Due to their prevalence on the Plasmodium surface, MSPs have been a key target for vaccine development. Anti-malarial vaccines have been developed to target the merozoite at different stages in its life cycle. Vaccines that target the merozoite in its asexual erythrocytic stage utilize merozoite surface proteins, particularly MSP-1. In addition to vaccines, researchers are developing drugs that bind to MSPs in order to disrupt merozoite replication. Suramin, a drug used to treat African sleeping sickness, has shown moderate success with binding to MSP-1 and its derivatives such as MSP-1_{19} to inhibit red blood cell invasion.

=== Challenges ===
The challenge faced when developing vaccines is the complexity and variation of these proteins. In merozoites of the same genus and species, the sequences encoding proteins such as MSP-1 vary depending on the region they are found. For example, the Combination B vaccine utilizes antigens of MSP-1 and MSP-2 but has limited efficacy based primarily on the MSP-2 alleles used. In an attempt to increase the efficiency of vaccines produced, constant regions such as MSP-1_{19} which remain on the surface of the Plasmodium after the merozoite stage are becoming a key focus for vaccine studies. Additionally, synthetic glycophosphatidylinositol (GPI) molecules are candidates since they elicit a strong immune response while simultaneously remaining relatively consistent in structure over various malarial strains. Also MSP3 is being studied as a vaccine antigen.
