= Apical membrane antigen 1 =

AMA-1
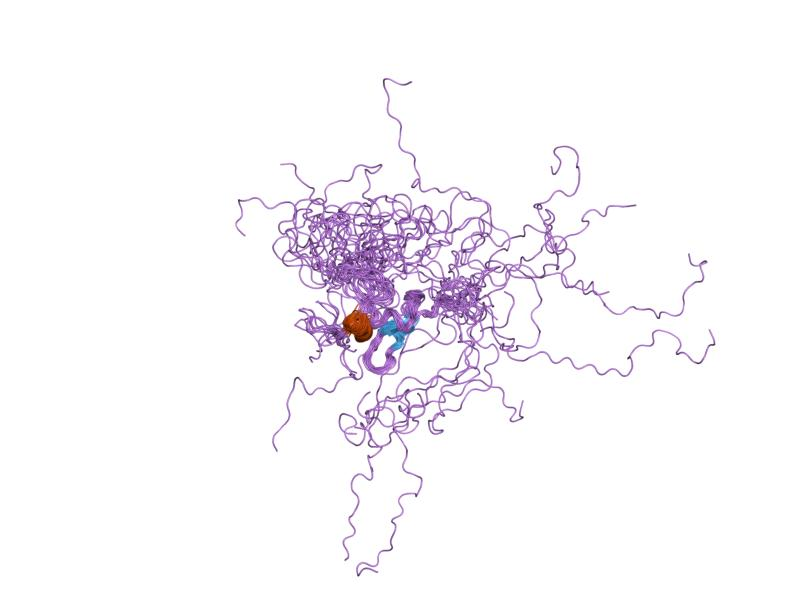
- solution structure of plasmodium falciparum apical membrane antigen 1 (residues 436-545)

Identifiers
- Symbol: AMA-1
- Pfam: PF02430
- InterPro: IPR003298
- SCOP2: 1hn6 / SCOPe / SUPFAM
Available protein structures:
- PDB: IPR003298 PF02430 (ECOD; PDBsum)
- AlphaFold: IPR003298; PF02430

In molecular biology, apical membrane antigen 1 is a novel antigen of Plasmodium falciparum which has been cloned. It contains a hydrophobic domain typical of an integral membrane protein. The antigen is designated apical membrane antigen 1 (AMA-1) by virtue of appearing to be located in the apical complex. AMA-1 appears to be transported to the merozoite surface close to the time of schizont rupture.

The 66kDa merozoite surface antigen (PK66) of Plasmodium knowlesi, a simian malaria, possesses vaccine-related properties believed to originate from a receptor-like role in parasite invasion of erythrocytes. The sequence of PK66 is conserved throughout Plasmodium, and shows high similarity to P. falciparum AMA-1. Following schizont rupture, the distribution of PK66 changes in a coordinate manner associated with merozoite invasion. Prior to rupture, the protein is concentrated at the apical end, following which it distributes itself entirely across the surface of the free merozoite. Immunofluorescence studies suggest that, during invasion, PK66 is excluded from the erythrocyte at, and behind, the invasion interface.
