= Malaria =

Mosquito-borne disease

- Other names: Ague, paludism, marsh fever
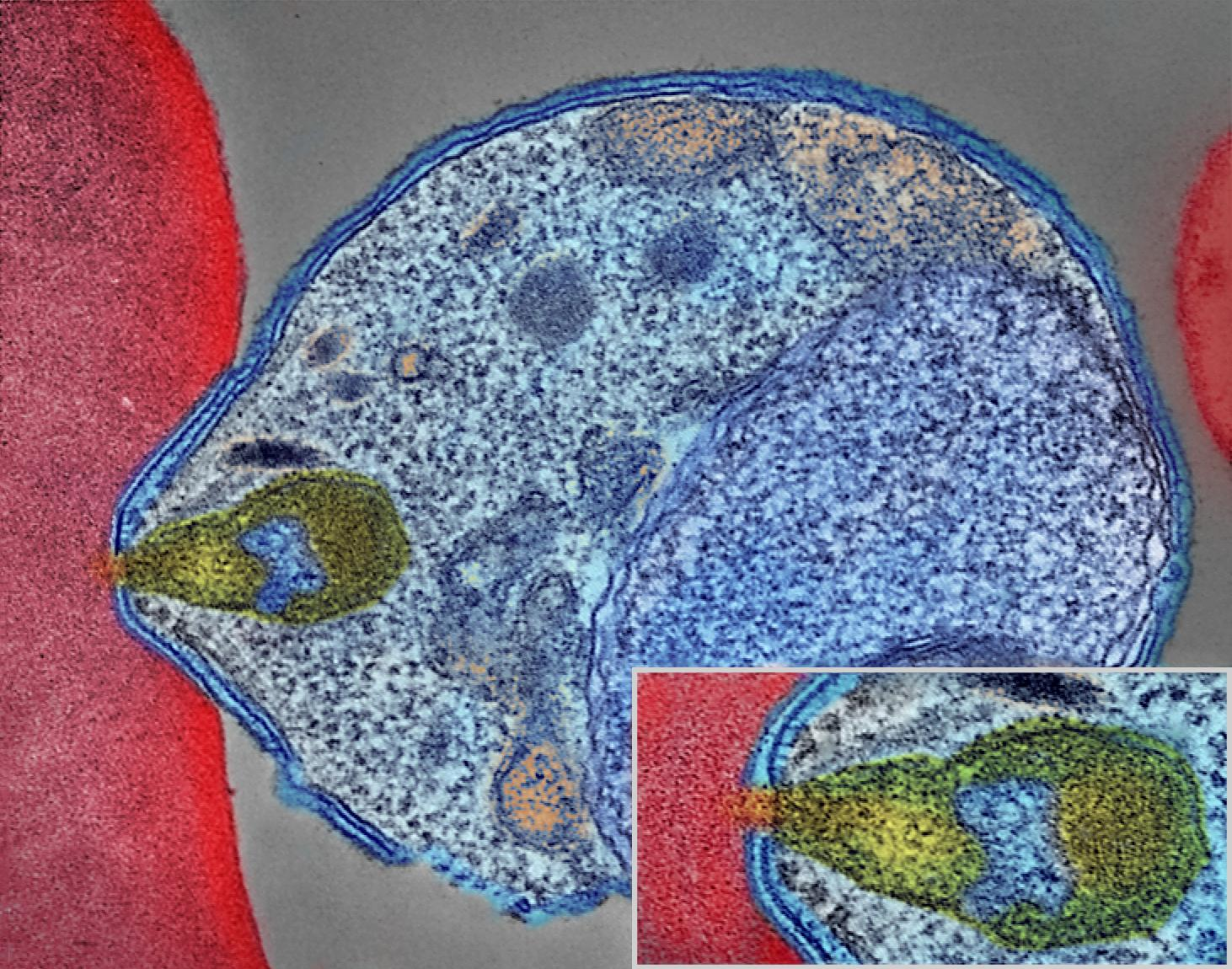
- Malaria parasite connecting to a red blood cell
- Pronunciation: /məˈlɛəriə/
- Specialty: Infectious disease
- Symptoms: Mild: fever, chills, vomiting, headache, diarrhoea. Severe: anaemia, jaundice, coma
- Complications: Seizures, coma, organ failure, anaemia, cerebral malaria
- Usual onset: Usually 10–15 days post exposure
- Duration: Lifelong if not treated
- Causes: Plasmodium transmitted by Anopheles mosquitoes
- Risk factors: Exposure to mosquitoes in endemic areas
- Diagnostic method: Examination of the blood, antigen detection tests
- Prevention: Mosquito nets, insect repellent, mosquito control, prophylactic medication
- Medication: Antimalarial medication
- Frequency: 282 million (2024)
- Deaths: 610,000 (2024)

Malaria is a mosquito-borne infectious disease that is spread by the bite of Anopheles mosquitoes. The symptoms typically include fever, fatigue, vomiting, and headaches. In severe cases, jaundice, seizures, coma, or death may occur. Symptoms usually begin 10 to 15 days after contacting the infection. Those who survive may develop partial immunity, being susceptible to reinfection although with milder symptoms. This partial resistance disappears over months to years if there is no continuing exposure.

Malaria is caused by single-celled parasites of the genus Plasmodium, generally spread through the bites of an infected female Anopheles mosquito. The mosquito bite introduces the parasites from the mosquito's saliva into the blood. The parasites initially reproduce and mature in the liver without causing symptoms. After a few days the mature parasites spread into the bloodstream, where they infect and destroy red blood cells, causing the symptoms of infection. Five species of Plasmodium commonly infect humans. The three species associated with more severe cases are P. falciparum (which is responsible for the vast majority of malaria deaths), P. vivax and P. knowlesi (a simian malaria that spills over into thousands of people a year). P. ovale and P. malariae generally cause a milder form of malaria. Malaria is typically diagnosed by the microscopic examination of blood using blood films, or with antigen-based rapid diagnostic tests. Methods that use the polymerase chain reaction to detect the parasite's DNA have been developed, and are now considered the gold standard, but they are not widely available or used in areas where malaria is common, due to their cost and complexity.

The risk of disease can be reduced by preventing mosquito bites through the use of mosquito nets and insect repellents or with mosquito-control measures such as spraying insecticides and draining standing water. Several medications are available to prevent malaria in areas where the disease is common. As of 2023, two malaria vaccines have been endorsed by the World Health Organization. The parasites have evolved resistance to several antimalarial medications; for example, chloroquine-resistant P. falciparum has spread to most malaria-prone areas and resistance to artemisinin has become a problem in some parts of Southeast Asia. Because of this, drug treatment for malaria infection should be tailored to best fit the Plasmodium species involved and the geographical location where the infection was acquired.

The disease is widespread in the tropical and subtropical regions that exist in a broad band around the equator. This includes much of sub-Saharan Africa, Asia and Latin America. In 2024, some 282 million cases of malaria worldwide resulted in an estimated 610,000 deaths, up from 273 million cases in 2023. The WHO African Region accounted approximately 94% of global malaria cases and 95% of total deaths occurred in 2024. Malaria is commonly associated with poverty and has a significant negative effect on economic development; in 2005 it was estimated that Africa loses US$12 billion a year due to increased healthcare costs, lost ability to work and adverse effects on tourism.

== Signs and symptoms ==
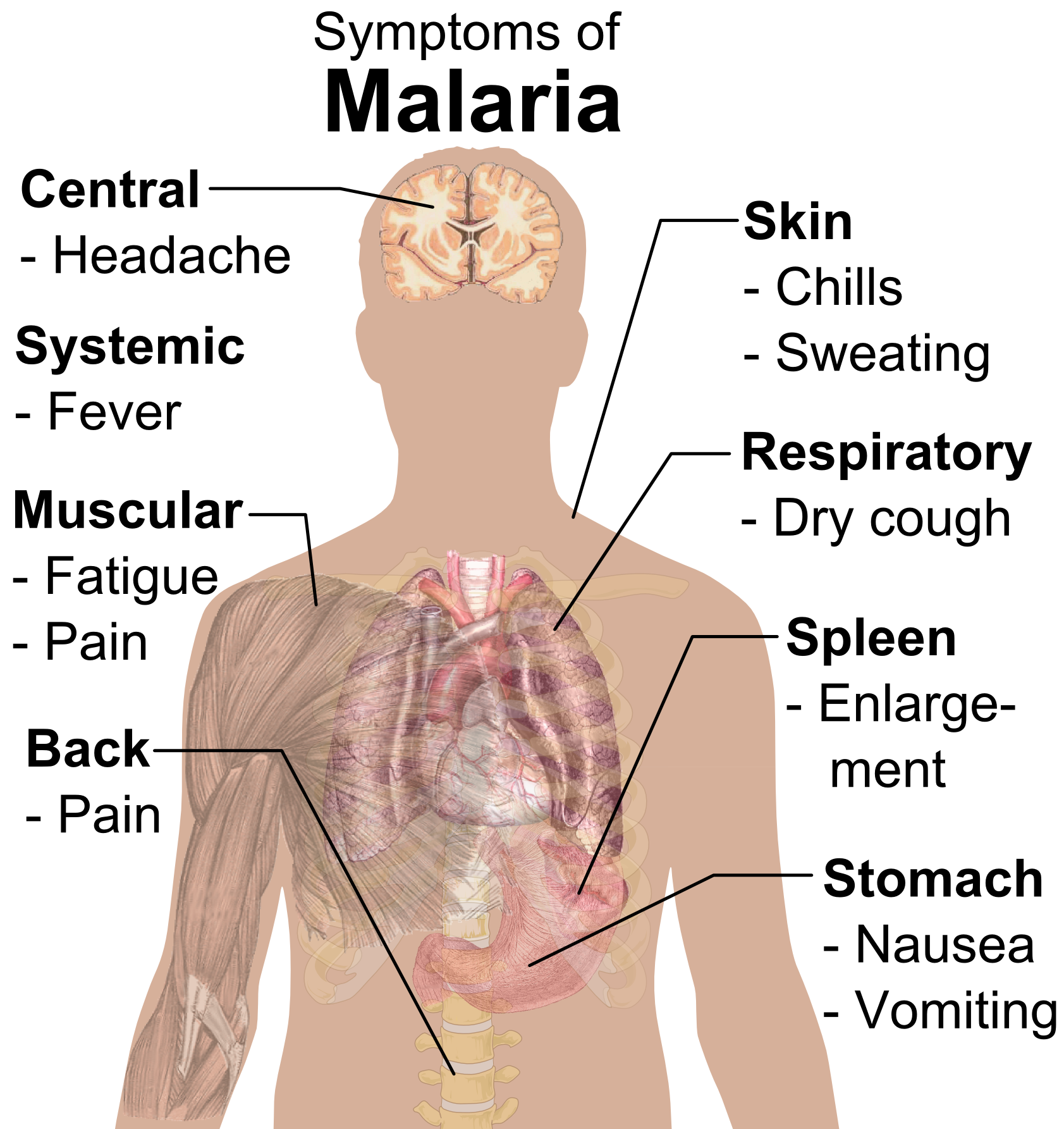
Main symptoms of malaria

Symptoms during the early stages of malaria infection are fever, chills, headache, nausea and vomiting and diarrhoea; more serious cases may show enlarged spleen or liver and mild jaundice. These symptoms can resemble other conditions such as sepsis, gastroenteritis, flu and other viral diseases. Without treatment, symptoms - particularly the fever - can settle into a regular pattern, recurring every two or three days (paroxysmal attacks).

Symptoms typically begin 10–15 days after the initial mosquito bite, but can occur as late as several months after infection. Travellers taking preventative malaria medications may develop symptoms once they stop taking the drugs.

Severe malaria occurs when the Plasmodium infection causes damage to vital organs such as the kidney, liver, lungs or brain. Symptoms include severe anaemia, jaundice, convulsions, confusion, coma, kidney failure and eventually death. Severe malaria is usually caused by P. falciparum; it should be treated as a medical emergency.

=== Complications ===
A unique feature of P. falciparum is its ability to generate adhesive proteins on the surface of infected red blood cells (RBC). Infected RBCs obstruct capillaries (causing hypoxia) and accumulate in vital organs, interfering with their function. P. falciparum infection underlies most severe complications of malaria.

Cerebral malaria is a form of severe malaria affecting the brain. Infected RBCs blocking capillaries in the brain trigger an immune reaction, which in turn damages the blood-brain barrier. Individuals with cerebral malaria exhibit neurological symptoms, such as confusion, seizures, or coma. Cerebral malaria, if untreated, can lead to death within forty-eight hours of the first symptoms; survivors may have long-term neurological damage.

Severe anaemia is caused by a combination of the destruction of RBCs (both infected and uninfected) together with reduced RBC production in the bone marrow; it is a major cause of deaths in children under 5.

Malaria can lead to acute respiratory distress syndrome in up to 25% of cases. It is caused by damage to the capillary endothelium, in turn damaging the alveoli of the lung. Symptoms are extreme shortness of breath and a bluish tinge to the lips (cyanosis) indicating lack of oxygen. It is a leading killer of adults, with around 40% mortality once symptoms begin.

Coinfection of HIV with malaria increases mortality.

Other complications include an enlarged spleen, enlarged liver or both of these. So-called blackwater fever occurs when haemoglobin from lysed red blood cells leaks into and discolours the urine; this often precedes kidney failure.

Malaria during pregnancy can cause stillbirths, infant mortality, miscarriage and low birth weight, particularly in P. falciparum infection, but also with P. vivax.

== Cause ==
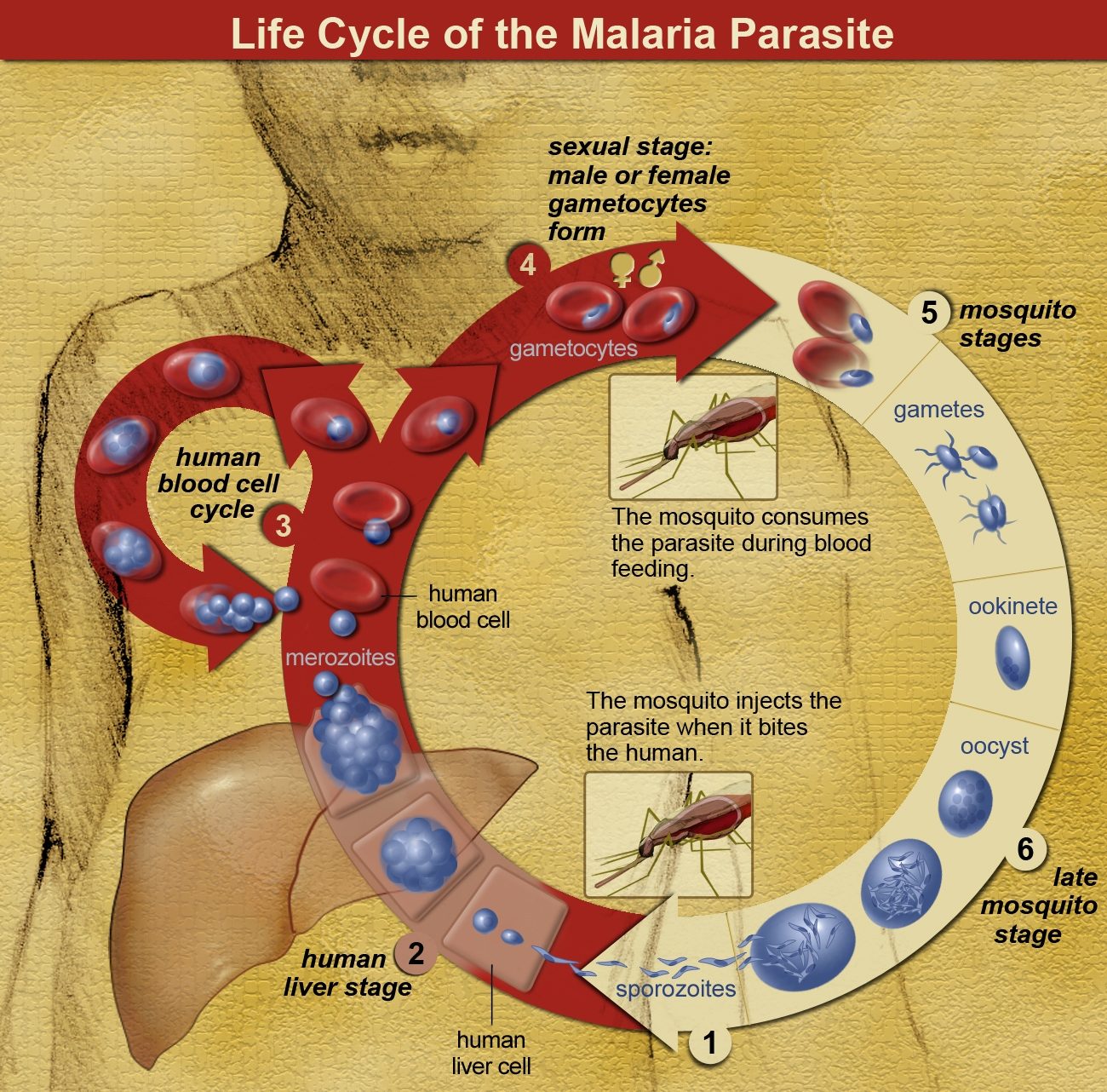
The life cycle of malaria parasites: Sporozoites are introduced by a mosquito bite. When they reach the liver, they multiply into thousands of merozoites. The merozoites infect red blood cells and replicate, infecting more and more red blood cells. Some parasites form gametocytes, which are taken up by a mosquito, continuing the life cycle.

Malaria is caused by infection with parasites in the genus Plasmodium, which are transmitted between the human hosts by mosquitoes in the genus Anopheles.

=== Life cycle ===
The plasmodium parasite has a complex life cycle involving human and mosquito hosts, taking a different form at each stage of the cycle.

- The Anopheles mosquitoes initially get infected by Plasmodium by taking a blood meal from a previously infected person. The next time the mosquito feeds, its bite introduces Plasmodium—in a mobile form called sporozoites—into a new human host.
- Within the human host, the sporozoites enter the bloodstream and travel to the liver, where they invade liver cells (hepatocytes).
- They grow and divide in the liver, with each infected hepatocyte eventually harboring up to 40,000 parasites. After 5 to 25 days the infected hepatocytes break down, releasing Plasmodium—in a smaller form called merozoites, into the bloodstream.
- In the blood, the merozoites rapidly invade individual red blood cells, with each replicating over 24–72 hours to form 16–32 new merozoites. The infected red blood cell bursts, releasing new merozoites which again infect red blood cells, resulting in a cycle that continuously amplifies the number of parasites in an infected person.
- A small portion of parasites do not replicate, but instead develop into early sexual stage parasites called male and female gametocytes. These gametocytes develop in the bone marrow for 11 days, then return to the blood circulation to await uptake by the bite of another mosquito.
- Once inside a mosquito, the gametocytes undergo sexual reproduction, and eventually form daughter sporozoites that migrate to the mosquito's salivary glands to be injected into a new host when the mosquito next bites.

The liver infection causes no symptoms; all symptoms of malaria result from the infection of red blood cells. Symptoms develop once there are more than around 100,000 parasites per milliliter of blood. Many of the symptoms associated with severe malaria are caused by the tendency of P. falciparum to bind to blood vessel walls, resulting in damage to the affected vessels and surrounding tissue. Parasites sequestered in the blood vessels of the lung contribute to respiratory failure. In the brain, they contribute to coma. During pregnancy they accumulate in the intervillous space and hinder the function of the placenta, contributing to low birthweight and preterm labor, and increasing the risk of abortion and stillbirth. The destruction of red blood cells during infection often results in anaemia, exacerbated by reduced production of new red blood cells during infection.

Only female mosquitoes feed on blood; male mosquitoes feed on plant nectar and do not transmit the disease. Females of the mosquito genus Anopheles prefer to feed at night. They usually start searching for a meal at dusk, and continue through the night until they succeed. However, they may be adapting to the extensive use of bed nets and beginning to bite earlier, before bed-nets are deployed. Malaria parasites can also be transmitted by blood transfusions, although this is rare.

=== Plasmodium species ===
In humans, malaria is caused by six Plasmodium species: P. falciparum, P. malariae, P. ovale curtisi, P. ovale wallikeri, P. vivax and P. knowlesi. Among those infected, P. falciparum is the most common species identified (~75%) followed by P. vivax (~20%). P. falciparum is prevalent in Africa and accounts for the majority of deaths, while P. vivax is dominant outside Africa. Some cases have been documented of human infections with several species of Plasmodium from higher apes, but except for P. knowlesi—a zoonotic species that causes malaria in macaques—these are mostly of limited public health importance.

Two species—P. vivax and P. ovale—form a dormant stage called a hypnozoite which can persist in the liver, even after drug treatment has eliminated the infection from the blood. These can reactivate after weeks or months and cause relapse of the disease.

=== Recurrent malaria ===
Symptoms of malaria can recur after varying symptom-free periods. Depending upon the cause, recurrence can be classified as either recrudescence, relapse, or reinfection. Recrudescence is when symptoms return after a symptom-free period due to failure to remove blood-stage parasites by adequate treatment. Relapse is when symptoms reappear after the parasites have been eliminated from the blood but have persisted as dormant hypnozoites in liver cells. Reinfection means that parasites were eliminated from the entire body but a new infection has established. Recurrence of infection within two weeks of treatment ending is typically attributed to treatment failure.

== Pathophysiology ==
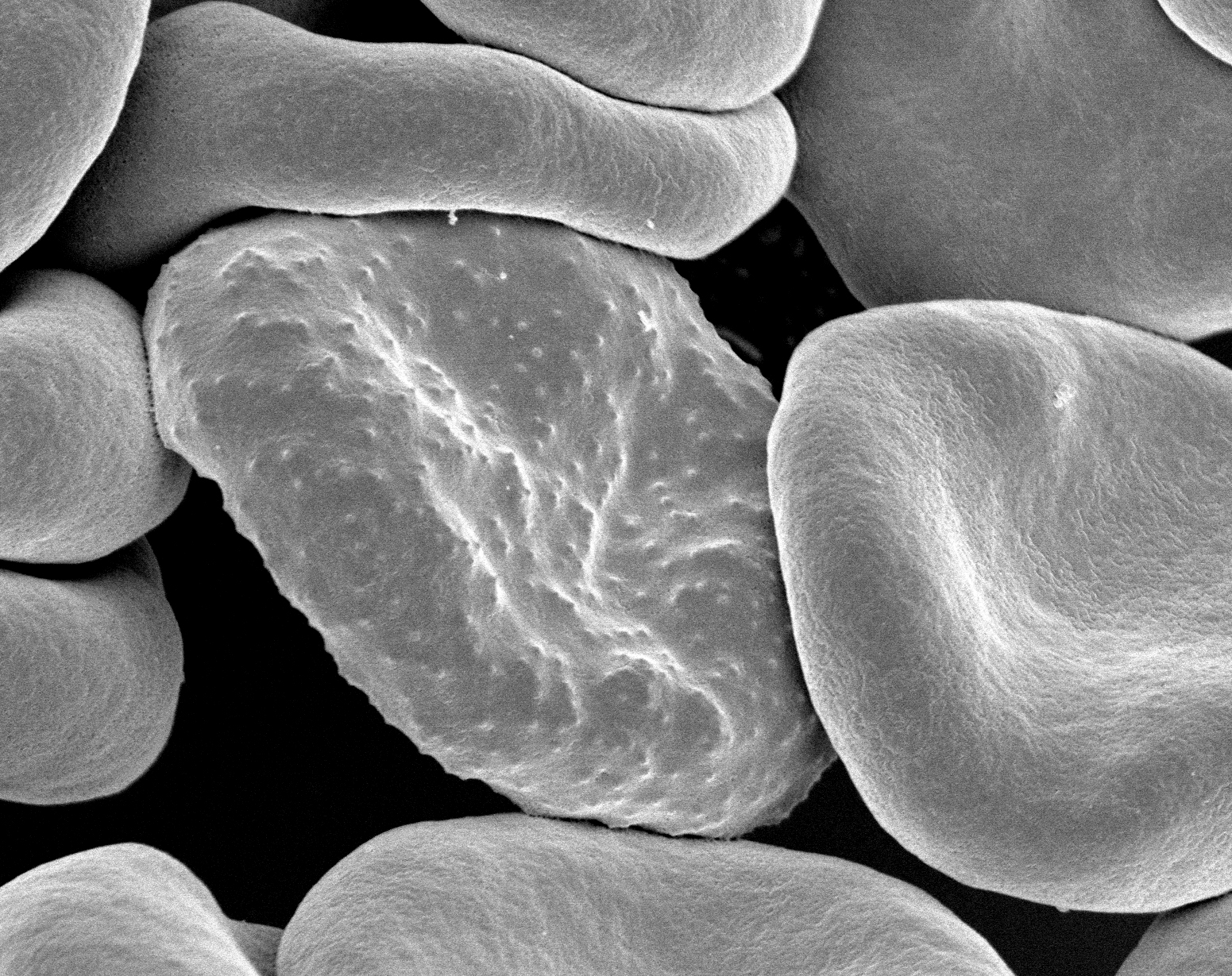
Electron micrograph of a Plasmodium falciparum-infected red blood cell (center), illustrating adhesion protein "knobs"

Malaria infection develops via two phases: one that involves the liver (exoerythrocytic phase), and one that involves red blood cells, or erythrocytes (erythrocytic phase). When an infected mosquito pierces a person's skin to take a blood meal, sporozoites in the mosquito's saliva enter the bloodstream and migrate to the liver where they infect hepatocytes, multiplying asexually and asymptomatically for a period of 8–30 days. During this time, these organisms differentiate to yield thousands of merozoites, which, following rupture of their host cells, escape into the blood and infect red blood cells to begin the erythrocytic stage of the life cycle.

The first phase of infection is asymptomatic; the clinical symptoms of malaria are all associated with the merozoite stage of the life cycle. In this, the parasites multiply asexually within red blood cells, periodically breaking out to infect new ones. Within each infected erythrocyte, the parasite multiplies, consuming the cytoplasm as it does. After a period of 2 or 3 days, the erythrocyte bursts, releasing a number (between 16 and 32) of new merozoites. This release of merozoites into the bloodstream, together with their waste products and fragments of erythrocyte, triggers fever and other symptoms which can be periodic and intense.

In some species of Plasmodium, some sporozoites do not immediately develop into exoerythrocytic-phase merozoites, but instead, produce hypnozoites that remain dormant for periods ranging from several months (7–10 months is typical) to several years. After a period of dormancy, they reactivate and produce merozoites. Hypnozoites are responsible for long incubation and late relapses in P. vivax and P. ovale infections.

=== Immune system evasion ===
Immune evasion is a key feature of Plasmodium, underlying its success and persistence as a parasite. Approximately 10% of the Plasmodium genome is dedicated to mechanisms which avoid or subvert the immune system.

==== Liver ====
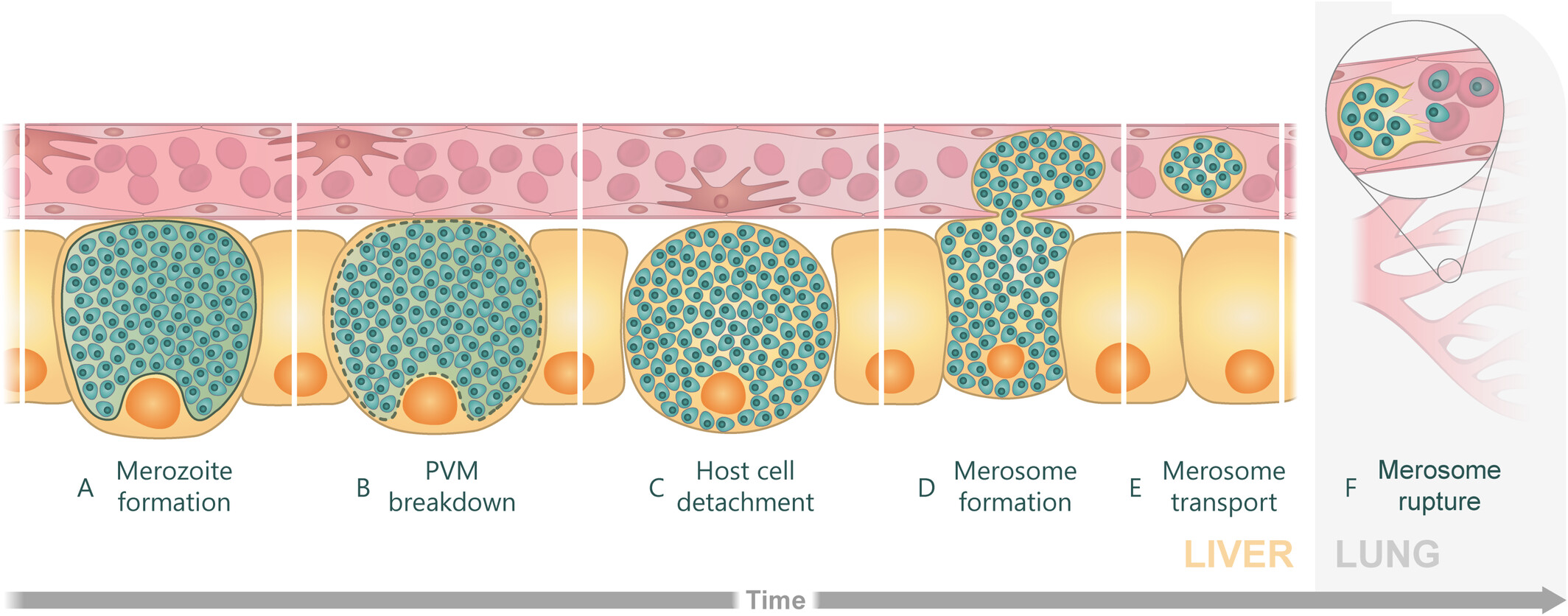
Illustration of a merosome budding off from an infected hepatocyte

Specialised macrophages called Kupffer cells defend the liver; they identify alien material in the bloodstream and destroy it. Sporozoites attack Kupffer cells and neutralise them. They transit through these impaired cells (which die after a few hours) to infect hepatocytes. Within the hepatocyte, they generate thousands of merozoites within a vacuole which protects them from cellular defence mechanisms. After a few days, the infected hepatocyte releases merozoites in batches called merosomes, which bud off from the hepatocyte's membrane. This membrane cloaks the merozoites, enabling them to sneak past the remaining Kupffer cells to exit the liver.

==== Circulation ====
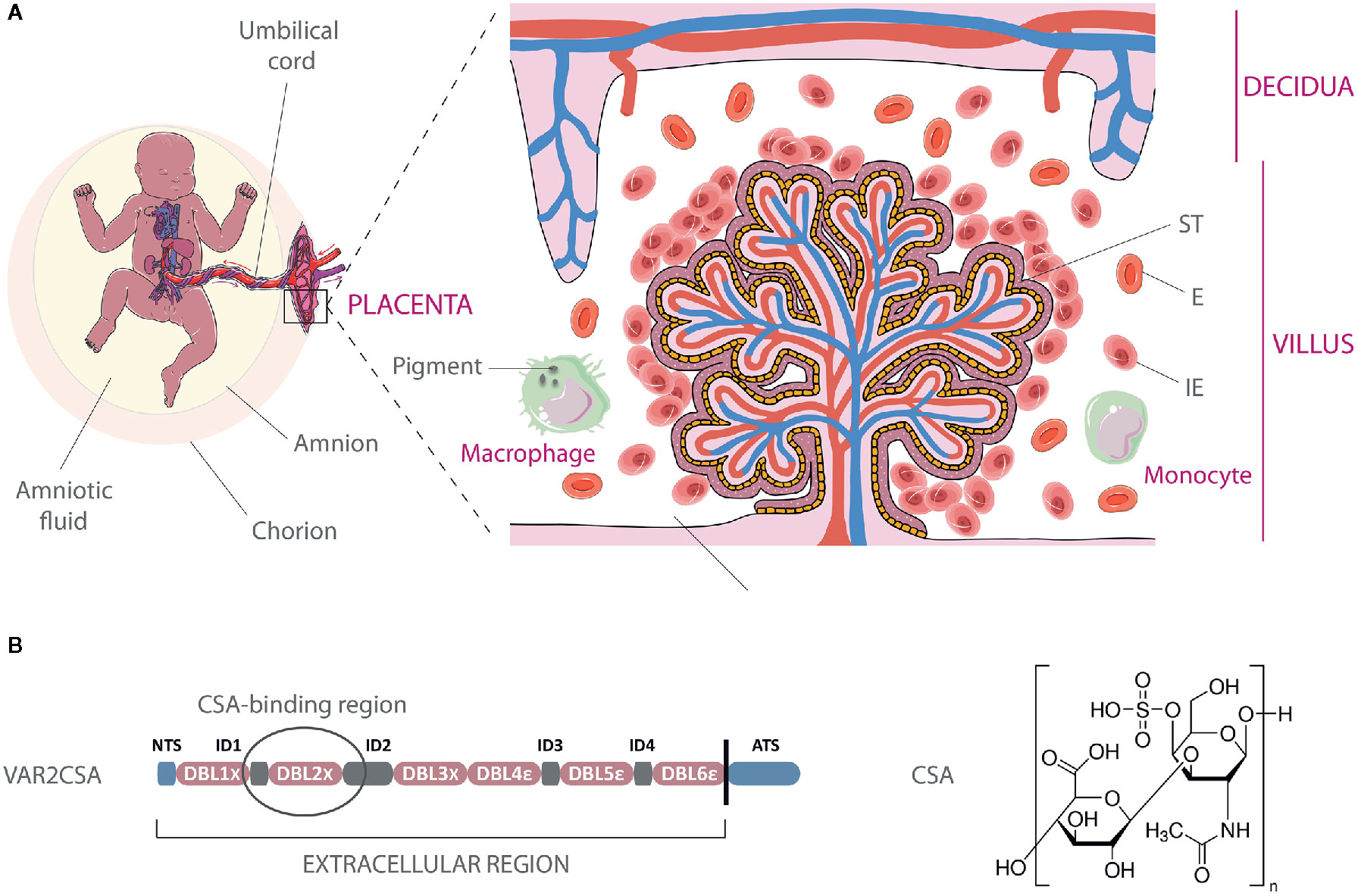
An illustration of infected erythrocytes (IE) clustering in the intervillous space around placental villi.

Free merozoites in the blood circulation system are vulnerable to attack by leucocytes which target their surface antigens. The parasite defeats this defence by means of antigenic polymorphism; at each stage of the life cycle it expresses a different variant of surface antigen, effectively a moving target which outpaces the adaptive immune system. Once they penetrate a red blood cell (RBC) merozoites have a safe haven, masked from leucocytes and protected within a vacuole. Infected RBCs can nevertheless be detected and destroyed, either by the spleen or by phagocytes. To avoid this fate, the merozoite generates adhesive proteins which appear as knobs on the surface of infected RBCs. These work in two ways. They bind to uninfected RBCs forming clumps - nicknamed "rosettes" - in which the infected cell at the centre is shielded by the uninfected cells surrounding it; rosettes interfere with normal blood flow in capillaries. Alternatively infected RBCs can avoid passage through the spleen by adhering (sequestering) to the walls of blood vessels in tissues such as the brain, lungs, and intervillous spaces (in pregnancy). Both sequestered and rosetted types interfere with the normal organ functions, leading to complications such as cerebral malaria and pregnancy-associated malaria.

=== Genetic resistance ===
Due to the high levels of mortality and morbidity caused by malaria—especially the P. falciparum species—it has placed the greatest selective pressure on the human genome in recent history. Several genetic factors provide some resistance to it including sickle cell trait, thalassaemia traits, glucose-6-phosphate dehydrogenase deficiency, and the absence of Duffy antigens on red blood cells.

The effect of sickle cell trait on malaria immunity illustrates some evolutionary trade-offs that have occurred because of endemic malaria. Sickle cell trait causes a change in the haemoglobin molecule in the blood. Normally, red blood cells have a very flexible, biconcave shape that allows them to move through narrow capillaries; however, when the modified haemoglobin S molecules are exposed to low amounts of oxygen, or crowd together due to dehydration, they can stick together forming strands that cause the cell to distort into a curved sickle shape. In these strands, the molecule is not as effective in taking or releasing oxygen, and the cell is not flexible enough to circulate freely. In the early stages of malaria, the parasite can cause infected red cells to sickle, and so they are removed from circulation sooner. This reduces the frequency with which malaria parasites complete their life cycle in the cell. Individuals who are homozygous (with two copies of the abnormal haemoglobin beta allele) have sickle-cell anaemia, while those who are heterozygous (with one abnormal allele and one normal allele) experience resistance to malaria without severe anaemia. Although the shorter life expectancy for those with the homozygous condition would tend to disfavour the trait's survival, the trait is preserved in malaria-prone regions because of the benefits provided by the heterozygous form.

== Diagnosis ==
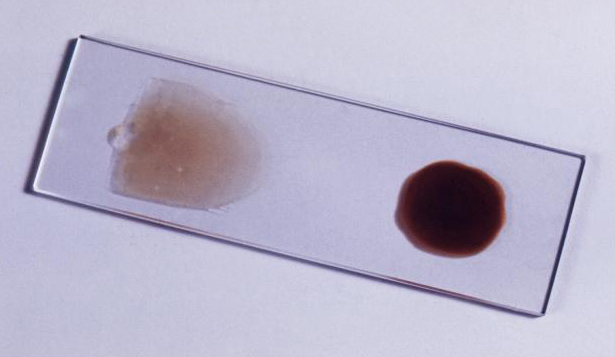
The blood film is the gold standard for malaria diagnosis.

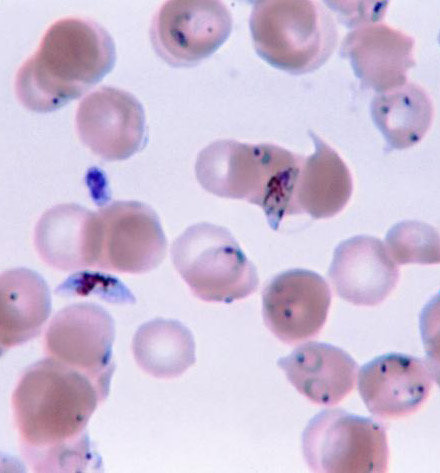
Ring-forms and gametocytes of Plasmodium falciparum in human blood

Due to the non-specific nature of malaria symptoms, diagnosis is typically suspected based on symptoms and travel history, then confirmed with a laboratory test to detect the presence of the parasite in the blood (parasitological test). In areas where malaria is common, the World Health Organization (WHO) recommends clinicians suspect malaria in any person who reports having fevers, or who has a current temperature above 37.5 °C without any other obvious cause. Malaria should be suspected in children with signs of anaemia: pale palms or a laboratory test showing haemoglobin levels below 8 grams per deciliter of blood. In areas of the world with little to no malaria, testing is only recommended for people with possible exposure to malaria (typically travel to a malaria-endemic area) and unexplained fever.

Malaria is usually confirmed by the microscopic examination of blood films or by antigen-based rapid diagnostic tests (RDT). Microscopy—i.e., examining Giemsa-stained blood with a light microscope—is the gold standard for malaria diagnosis. Microscopists typically examine both a "thick film" of blood, allowing them to scan many blood cells in a short time, and a "thin film" of blood, allowing them to clearly see individual parasites and identify the infecting Plasmodium species. Under typical field laboratory conditions, a microscopist can detect parasites when there are at least 100 parasites per microliter of blood, which is around the lower range of symptomatic infection. Microscopic diagnosis is relatively resource intensive, requiring trained personnel, specific equipment and a consistent supply of microscopy slides and stains.

Rapid diagnostic tests (RDTs) can be used to confirm a microscopic diagnosis; they are also used in places where microscopy is unavailable. RDTs are fast and easily deployed to places without full diagnostic laboratories. The test detects parasite proteins in a fingerstick blood sample. A variety of RDTs are available, targeting the parasite proteins lactate dehydrogenase, aldolase, or histidine rich protein 2 (HRP2, which is specific to P. falciparum only). The HRP2 test is widely used in Africa, where P. falciparum predominates. However, since HRP2 persists in the blood for up to five weeks after an infection is treated, an HRP2 test sometimes cannot distinguish whether someone currently has malaria or previously had it. Additionally, some P. falciparum parasites lack the HRP2 gene, complicating detection. Rapid tests also cannot quantify the parasite burden in a person, nor the species of Plasmodium involved.

A polymerase chain reaction (PCR) test is the most sensitive method for diagnosing malaria. The test amplifies parasite DNA in blood; it can detect Plasmodium and identify the species, even at very low levels in the blood. It requires specialised laboratory equipment so is rarely available in developing countries; it is generally used in developed world to confirm diagnosis in returning travellers.

In April 2026, WHO prequalified three rapid diagnostic tests designed to detect P. falciparum strains with pfhrp2 deletions, which can evade commonly used HRP2-based tests and cause false-negative results. The new tests target the parasite protein pf-LDH and are recommended where more than 5% of malaria cases are missed because of pfhrp2 deletions.

== Prevention ==
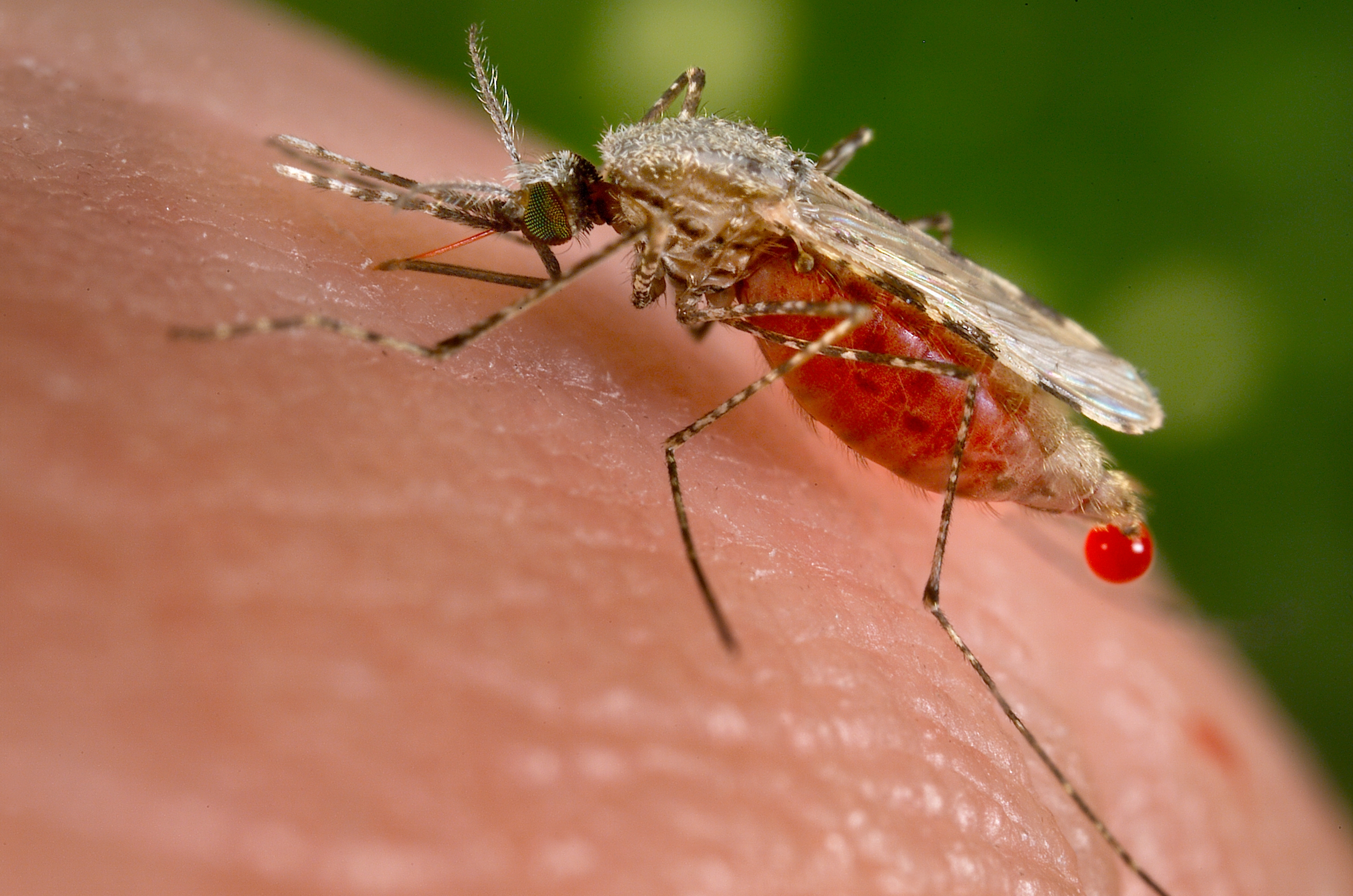
An Anopheles stephensi mosquito shortly after obtaining blood from a human (the droplet of blood is expelled as a surplus). This mosquito is a vector of malaria, and mosquito control is an effective way of reducing its incidence.

Methods used to prevent malaria include vaccination, prophylactic medication, mosquito elimination and the prevention of bites.

=== Vaccines ===
It has proved very difficult to develop an effective malaria vaccine. The parasite has evolved several strategies to evade the human immune response. There are five species of plasmodium; each of these has three life stages in the human host—sporozoite, merozoite and gametocyte. Each stage has different antigens on its surface, meaning that an immune response against one stage is not effective against the others. In addition, genetic variation in the parasites means that the antigens themselves can vary even within a single life stage. As a consequence, natural immunity seems to develop slowly—acquired through multiple infections—is only partial, and is not long lasting. The Malaria Vaccine Technology Roadmap has set a target for new malaria vaccines to have a protective efficacy of at least 75% against clinical malaria.

The first promising vaccine studies into a malaria vaccine were performed in 1967 by immunising mice with live, radiation-attenuated Plasmodium sporozoites, which provided significant protection to the mice upon subsequent injection with normal, viable sporozoites.

In 2013, the WHO and the malaria vaccine funders group set a goal to develop vaccines designed to interrupt malaria transmission with the long-term goal of malaria eradication. As of February 2026, two malaria vaccines have been licensed for use.

The first approved vaccine targeting P. falciparum is RTS,S, known by the brand name Mosquirix, which completed clinical trials in 2014. The WHO adopted a cautious approach to awarding it prequalification and, as part of the Malaria Vaccine Implementation Programme (MVIP) approved pilot programs in three sub-Saharan African countries—Ghana, Kenya and Malawi—starting in 2019. These programs targeted children under 5, who are particularly at risk of severe infection and death. It was approved by the World Health Organization in 2021. Up to 2023, three million children had received the vaccine, showing a significantly reduced incidence of malaria as well as a reduction in childhood mortality (from all causes) of 13%.

The second vaccine is R21/Matrix-M, with a 77% efficacy rate shown in initial trials and significantly higher antibody levels than with the RTS,S vaccine. The R-21/Matrix M malaria vaccine was found to reduce cases of malaria by 75% in areas with seasonal spread and by 68% in areas of year-round spread in children in sub-Saharan Africa. The R-21/Matrix M malaria vaccine was endorsed by the WHO for the prevention of malaria in children in 2023.

=== Mosquito control ===
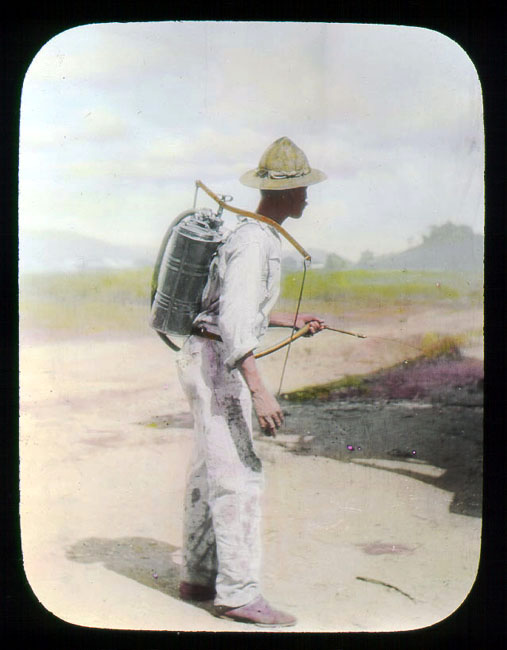
Man spraying kerosene oil in standing water, Panama Canal Zone, 1912

The objective of mosquito control is to stop mosquitoes from biting humans - either by using some forms of barrier, or by reducing mosquito numbers. They can broadly be classified as personal protection, environmental controls outside buildings, indoor measures within houses and buildings, and those incorporated into the fabric of buildings.

==== Personal protection ====
Insect repellent, such as DEET or picaridin, is recommended for travellers. Loose clothing that covers most of the body is also recommended. Clothing may be treated with permethrin as an additional safeguard.

==== Environmental control ====
Since many mosquitoes breed in standing water, source reduction can be as simple as emptying water from containers around the home, by filling or draining puddles, swampy areas and tree stumps. Eliminating such mosquito breeding areas can be an extremely effective and permanent way to reduce mosquito populations without resorting to insecticides. It is also possible to use larvicides to kill mosquito larvae in pools or puddles that cannot be drained.

==== Indoors ====
Insecticide-treated nets (ITNs) and indoor residual spraying (IRS) are effective, have been widely used to prevent malaria, and their use has contributed significantly to reducing the prevalence of malaria in the 21st century. ITNs and IRS may not be sufficient to eliminate the disease, as these interventions depend on how many people use nets, how many gaps in insecticide there are (low coverage areas), if people are not protected when outside of the home, and an increase in mosquitoes that are resistant to insecticides.

===== Insecticide-treated nets =====
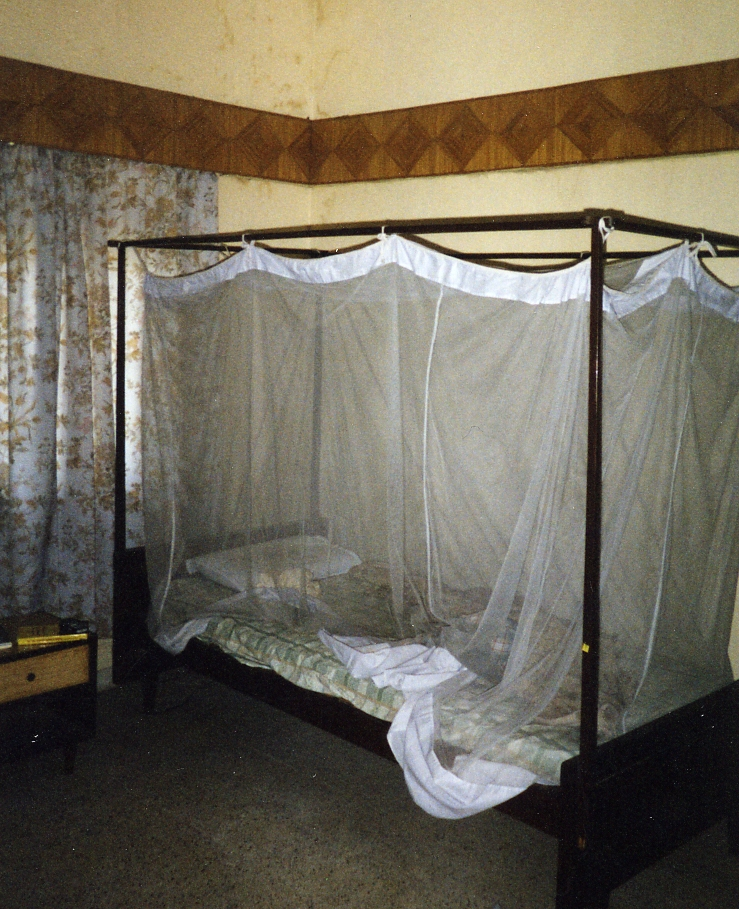
A mosquito net in use

Mosquito nets help keep mosquitoes away from people and reduce infection rates and transmission of malaria. Nets are not a perfect barrier and are often treated with an insecticide designed to kill the mosquito before it has time to find a way past the net. ITNs are estimated to be twice as effective as untreated nets and offer greater than 70% protection compared with no net.

Most nets are impregnated with pyrethroids, a class of insecticides with low toxicity; they are most effective when used from dusk to dawn. In areas where mosquitoes are resistant to pyrethroids, other ingredients are being combined with pyrethroids in mosquito netting; these include piperonyl butoxide, chlorfenapyr and pyriproxyfen.

UNICEF notes that the use of insecticide-treated nets has been increased since 2000 through accelerated production, procurement and delivery, stating that "almost 2.5 billion ITNs have been distributed globally since 2004, with 2.2 billion (87 per cent) distributed in sub-Saharan Africa". By 2023, 52% of children in sub-Saharan Africa were sleeping under ITNs; however, there were large regional differences in coverage.

A 2025 Malaria Atlas Project analysis estimated that malaria interventions in Africa prevented 1.57 billion cases from 2000 to 2024, with ITNs accounting for 72% of cases averted. The report warned that progress has slowed due to plateauing ITN coverage and emphasized that expanding access to ITNs remains essential.

===== Indoor residual spraying =====
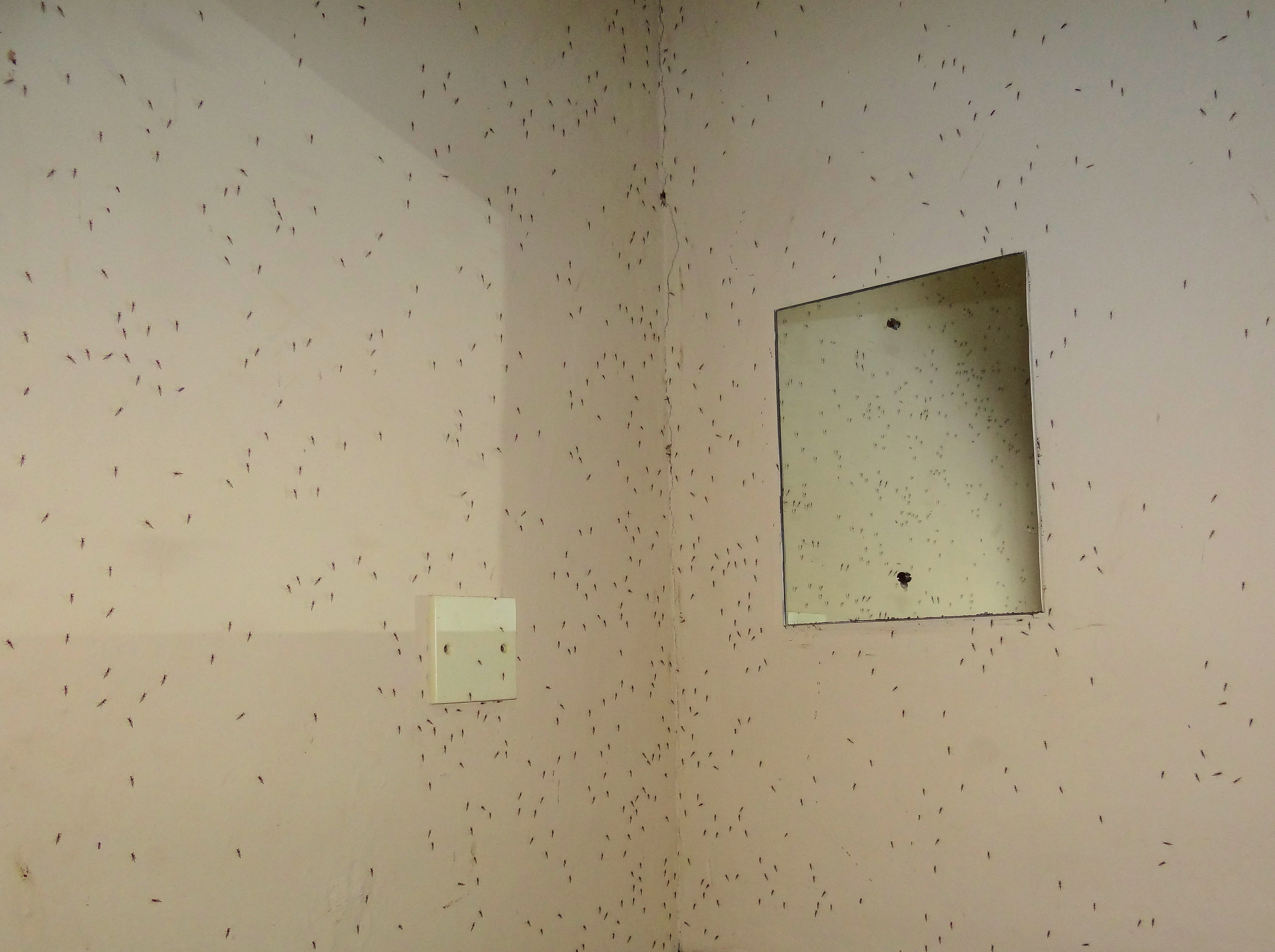
Walls where indoor residual spraying of DDT has been applied. The dead mosquitoes remain on the wall, eventually falling to the floor.

Indoor residual spraying (IRS) is the spraying of insecticides on the walls inside a home. After a blood meal (during which it may ingest Plasmodium parasites), the female mosquito rests on a nearby surface while digesting the blood and developing eggs. If the walls of houses have been coated with insecticides, the resting mosquitoes can be killed before they can bite another person. Spraying indoor surfaces does not prevent the mosquito from its first feeding; however, it protects the community as a whole by preventing a second blood meal in which they may pass the infection to a human host. Chemicals recommended by WHO for IRS fall into the following classes:

- Pyrethroids such as Alpha-cypermethrin, Bifenthrin
- Organophosphates such as malathion
- Carbamates: Bendiocarb, Propoxur
- Organochlorides: DDT (very restricted use)

In order to be effective, IRS should be applied to a minimum of 80% of households in a community. It is estimated that IRS has contributed to 10% of the malaria cases averted in parts of Africa.

==== Structures ====
To keep mosquitoes from entering the home, screens should be installed on windows and doors and eaves, as well as netting to cover any other sources of ventilation. In 2021, the World Health Organization's (WHO) Guideline Development Group conditionally recommended screening houses in this manner to reduce malaria transmission. Several studies have suggested that screening houses can have a significant effect on malaria transmission. Beyond the protective barrier screening provides, it also does not call for daily behavioral changes in the household. Screening eaves can also have a community-level protective effect, ultimately reducing mosquito-biting densities in neighboring houses that do not have this intervention in place.

==== Limitations in vector control ====
As insecticides are used more widely, mosquito populations can evolve resistance, reducing the effectiveness of both long-lasting insecticide-treated nets (LLINs) and indoor residual spraying (IRS). This resistance can occur through physiological mechanisms, in which genetic changes allow mosquitoes to survive insecticide contact. Mosquitoes with these advantageous traits can pass them on to their offspring, increasing the proportion of resistant mosquitoes in the population over time.

Beyond physiological resistance, malaria vectors have demonstrated behavioral adaptations that further reduce the effectiveness of current vector control methods. These changes are termed "behavioral resistance", where mosquito behavior shifts in ways that reduce exposure to insecticides. Anopheles mosquitoes have traditionally exhibited endophagy, meaning they prefer to bite humans indoors, and endophily, meaning they rest indoors after feeding. They also typically bite at night, when individuals are protected by bed nets.

However, some Anopheles species have increasingly been observed biting earlier in the evening or outdoors, exhibiting exophagy, when people are less likely to be protected by bed nets or indoor spraying. They may also rest outdoors rather than on indoor walls that have been sprayed, exhibiting exophily. These behavioral changes contribute to what is known as residual transmission, defined as malaria transmission that persists even after the implementation of core vector control interventions. As a result, malaria transmission can continue even in areas with widespread use of LLINs and IRS.

These adaptations indicate a key limitation of current strategies, which primarily rely on interrupting the human mosquito contact during nighttime indoor feeding. Therefore, incorporating vector behavioral changes into malaria control strategies is increasingly important, as the protective effects of their interventions are being reduced by such adaptations.

=== Medication ===
There are a number of medications that can help prevent or interrupt malaria in travellers to places where infection is common; many of these medications are also used in treatment. In places where Plasmodium is resistant to one or more medications, three medications—mefloquine, doxycycline, or the combination of atovaquone/proguanil (Malarone)—are frequently used for prevention.

The protective effect does not begin immediately, and people visiting areas where malaria exists are recommended to start taking the drugs one to two weeks before they arrive, and continue taking them for four weeks after leaving (except for atovaquone/proguanil, which only needs to be started two days before and continued for seven days afterward). Malaria preventative medications are recommended for those vulnerable to the disease. Children under 5-years old, pregnant women, and some experts recommend school age children, in malaria endemic areas are recommended to receive malaria preventative medications on a seasonal basis or intermittent basis. Combining malarial preventative medications with anti-malarial vaccines has a greater effect in reducing malaria case-loads than medications alone.

Intermittent preventive therapy is an intervention that has been used successfully to control malaria in pregnant women and infants, and in preschool children where transmission is seasonal. During pregnancy, medication to prevent malaria has been found to improve the weight of the baby at birth and decrease the risk of anaemia in the mother. Giving antimalarial drugs to infants through intermittent preventive therapy can reduce the risk of having malaria infection, hospital admission and anaemia.

Antimalarial mass drug administration to an entire population at the same time may reduce the risk of contracting malaria in the population. In the 1950s, the WHO included mass drug administration (MDA) of antimalarial drugs as a tool for malaria eradication in exceptional conditions when conventional control techniques have failed. In 1971, the WHO expert committee on malaria still recommended MDA in special circumstances. Subsequently, MDA was linked to the emergence of drug resistance and its overall benefit was questioned.

=== Others ===
Community participation and health education strategies promoting awareness of malaria and the importance of control measures have been successfully used to reduce the incidence of malaria in some areas of the developing world. Recognising the disease in the early stages can prevent it from becoming fatal. Education can also inform people to cover over areas of stagnant, still water, such as water tanks that are ideal breeding grounds for the parasite and mosquito, thus cutting down the risk of the transmission between people. This is generally used in urban areas where there are large centers of population in a confined space and transmission would be most likely in these areas.

== Treatment ==
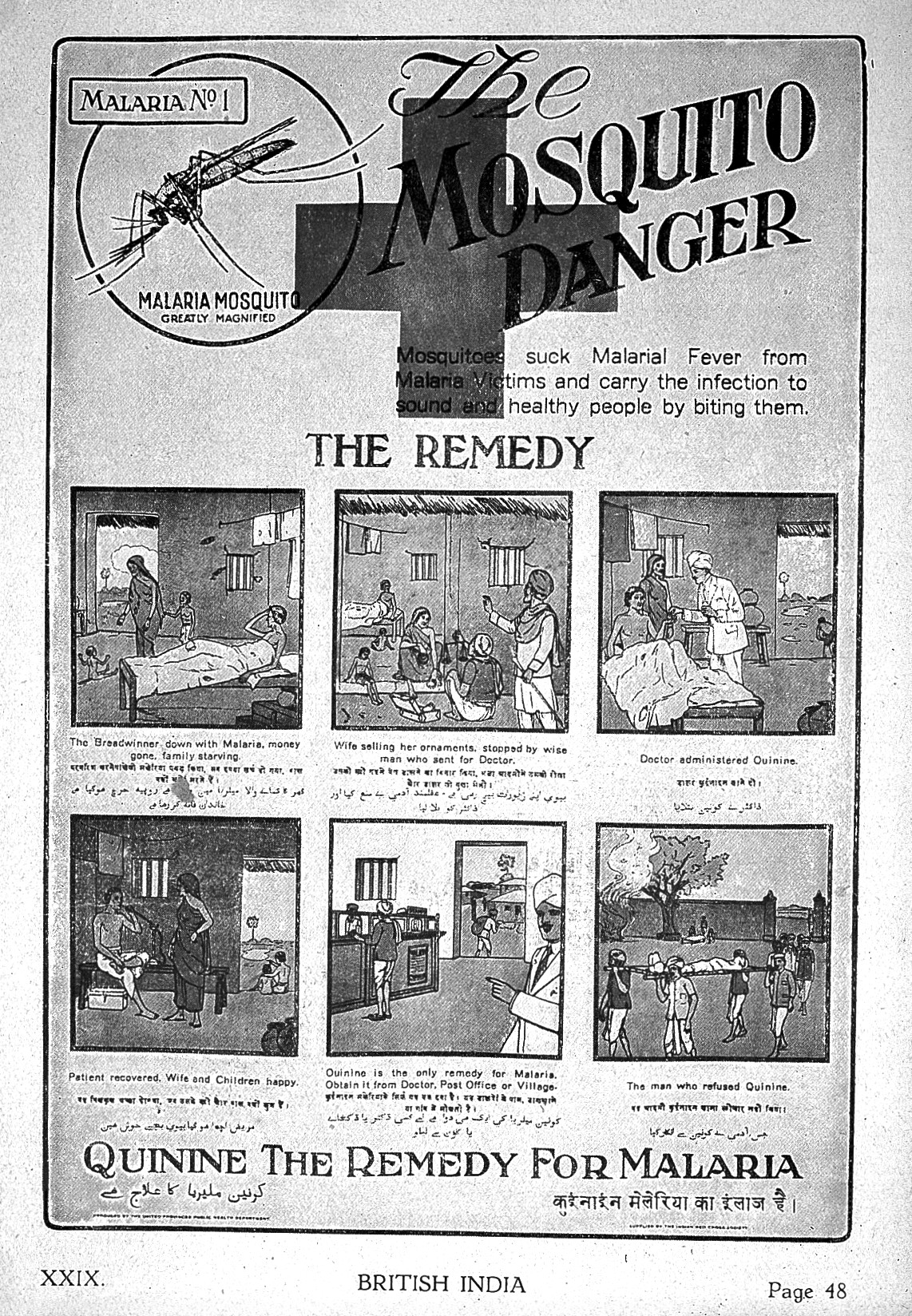
An advertisement for quinine as a malaria treatment from 1927

Malaria is treated with antimalarial medications. To ensure a complete cure and prevent the parasite from developing drug resistance, treatment guidelines since 2001 generally require two drugs in combination, with one of them being a derivative of artemisinin and the other a complementary drug. The exact combination of drugs depends on the Plasmodium species involved, the probability of drug resistance, relevant facts from the patient's medical and travel history and any previous use of antimalarials. Treatment regimens in national formularies (Note: Examples of formularies: UK, USA, Canada) are generally based on guidelines issued by WHO which are updated regularly.

Several classes of drugs can be used as components of combination therapies. Artemisinin-based drugs include artemether and artesunate. Quinoline derivatives include chloroquine, quinine and mefloquine. Antifolate compounds include pyrimethamine, proguanil and sulfadoxine. Other drugs include lumefantrine, atovaquone, doxycycline and clindamycin.

Malaria is generally classified as either "severe" or "uncomplicated". Symptoms which indicate severe malaria include the following (not a complete list):

- Decreased consciousness, coma, convulsions
- Severe anaemia
- Acute respiratory distress syndrome
- Kidney failure or haemoglobin in the urine
- Jaundice
- Acidosis or lactate levels of greater than 5 mmol/L
- A high level of parasites visible in a blood smear.

=== Uncomplicated malaria ===
Uncomplicated malaria can be treated using oral medication taken for between 3 and 7 days. The drug regimen should be selected according to Plasmodium species, location and patient's history. As an example, the most common first-line treatment for uncomplicated P. falciparum malaria is Artemether-lumefantrine taken orally over three days. In 2026, WHO prequalified the first artemether-lumefantrine formulation specifically developed for newborns and young infants weighing between 2 and 5 kg.

This treatment is not always suitable, so other drug combinations are recommended. Treatment should start as soon as possible after diagnosis, in order to prevent severe symptoms from developing. In case of infection by P. vivax or P. ovale (which form dormant hypnozoites in the liver) treatment should continue for a further 7 to 14 days.

=== Severe and complicated malaria ===
Severe malaria is generally caused by P. falciparum; it is almost always fatal if untreated. Even with treatment, the fatality rate is estimated between 13% and 20%, with survivors often facing long term after-effects. The standard treatment is intravenous artesunate, switching to oral medication once the patient is stable. Patients may deteriorate rapidly, therefore making close monitoring, preferably in a high dependency unit, vital.

=== Pregnancy ===
Malaria in pregnancy is more likely to be serious, possibly fatal, for both mother and child; pregnant women are three times more likely to develop severe malaria. Some drugs could injure the developing embryo, especially during the first trimester. Special treatment regimens are recommended, which vary according to the trimester and pose minimal risk.

=== Drug resistance ===
Drug resistance poses a growing problem in malaria treatment; Plasmodium populations have a high level of genetic diversity and a rapid reproduction rate which enable them to adapt and evade challenges from antimalarials. P. falciparum parasites began to develop resistance to the first synthetic antimalarial, chloroquine, in the 1950s; since then chloroquine resistance has spread to almost the entire range of this species. Resistance to proguanil developed even more rapidly; the drug was introduced in 1948 and resistance began to be noted the next year, in 1949. In 2001, malaria with partial resistance to artemisinin emerged in Southeast Asia; resistance has subsequently spread to parts of Africa. In order to overcome resistance, drugs may be given in combination, in higher doses, or for longer periods; there is an urgent need for new drugs to be brought on line.

== Prognosis ==
When properly treated, people with uncomplicated malaria can usually expect a complete recovery. However, severe malaria can progress extremely rapidly and cause death within hours or days. In the most severe cases of the disease, fatality rates can reach 20%, even with intensive care and treatment.

Malaria has the potential to cause permanent damage to many organs, especially the brain, kidney, liver and spleen. During childhood, malaria causes anaemia during a period of rapid brain development, and also direct brain damage resulting from cerebral malaria. Survivors of cerebral malaria have an increased risk of neurological and cognitive deficits, behavioural disorders and epilepsy.

Malaria death rates

Death rate from malaria

== Epidemiology ==
Incidence of malaria (new cases per 1,000 population)

According to the World Health Organization's 2025 World Malaria Report, there were an estimated 282 million new malaria cases globally in 2024, in 80 endemic countries. The number of deaths attributed to malaria stood at 610,000 in 2024. Children under five years old were the most affected, accounting for 75% of malaria deaths in Africa during 2024.

The malaria parasite depends on mosquitoes of the Anopheles genus to transmit between hosts. It is endemic in areas where conditions are favourable for these species of mosquitoes. This includes almost all tropical and subtropical areas of the world, where either regular rainfall creates essential breeding habitats all year, or seasonally during and after rainy seasons when standing water is abundant. The optimum temperature for the parasite is 27 °C (81 °F) but it can develop in temperatures between 20 °C (68 °F) and 40 °C (104 °F). Malaria is uncommon at altitudes above 1,500 meters, where temperatures tend to be lower, and in urban environments where good drainage eliminates pools of water.

Malaria is presently endemic in a broad band around the equator, in areas of the Americas, many parts of Asia and much of Africa. Malaria was once common in parts of Europe and North America, where it is no longer endemic. Anopheles mosquitoes are still present in these areas, so there is a risk of the disease returning.

- Since 2015, the WHO European Region has been free of malaria. Travel-related cases still occur occasionally.
- The United States eradicated malaria as a major public health concern in 1951. A small number of cases are detected each year, mostly in travellers returning from malaria endemic areas.
- The African region continues to bear a disproportionate share of the global malaria burden, accounting for 95% of all cases and 95% of deaths.

Those most at risk of severe malaria if they are exposed to the disease are:

- infants & children under 5 years, who have not yet developed immunity to the parasite.
- pregnant women, because pregnancy modifies the immune response.
- maternal malaria also affects the unborn foetus, leading to premature delivery and low birth weight, a leading cause of infant mortality.
- and others with weakened immune system, such as people affected by HIV/AIDS.

Travelers to endemic areas are at risk because they also lack immunity.

=== Climate change ===
Climate change is likely to affect malaria transmission, but the degree of effect and the areas affected is uncertain. Greater rainfall in certain areas of India, and following an El Niño event is associated with increased mosquito numbers.

Since 1900 there has been substantial change in temperature and rainfall over Africa. However, factors that contribute to how rainfall results in water for mosquito breeding are complex, incorporating the extent to which it is absorbed into soil and vegetation for example, or rates of runoff and evaporation. Recent research has provided a more in-depth picture of conditions across Africa, combining a malaria climatic suitability model with a continental-scale model representing real-world hydrological processes.

==== Changes in geographic distribution ====
Climate change has led to shifts in malaria-endemic regions, with the disease expanding into higher altitudes and previously malaria-free areas. Rising temperatures allow mosquitoes to survive in regions that were once too cold for them, including highland areas in Africa, South America and parts of Asia. A study analyzing malaria cases in Ethiopian and Colombian highlands found a strong correlation between increased temperatures and malaria incidence, demonstrating that climate change has made previously inhospitable areas suitable for transmission.

==== Increased transmission season ====
Malaria transmission is highly sensitive to temperature and rainfall patterns. Climate change has led to longer transmission seasons in tropical regions, where mosquitoes can breed year-round due to prolonged periods of high humidity and warm temperatures. Research suggests that in parts of sub-Saharan Africa, the malaria transmission season has lengthened by several months, particularly in regions where warming has pushed temperatures into the optimal range for Plasmodium falciparum development. In regions such as West Africa and parts of India, increasing temperatures and prolonged rainy seasons have contributed to a rise in malaria cases. Some studies predict that by 2050, many malaria-endemic areas will experience a 20–30% increase in transmission duration due to warming trends.

==== Extreme weather ====
Extreme weather events, such as heavy rainfall, flooding and droughts, are increasing in frequency and intensity due to climate change, creating favorable conditions for malaria outbreaks. Flooding provides ideal breeding grounds for mosquitoes by forming stagnant water pools, while droughts can also exacerbate malaria by forcing human populations to store water in open containers, which serve as mosquito habitats. This effect has been observed in parts of sub-Saharan Africa and South Asia, where prolonged drought periods were followed by spikes in malaria cases. A review of malaria outbreaks linked to climate variability found that El Niño events, which increase rainfall and temperatures in malaria-endemic regions, have been associated with significant surges in cases.

==== Resistance and adaptation of vectors ====
Higher temperatures accelerate the development of Plasmodium parasites within mosquitoes, potentially leading to increased transmission efficiency. Additionally, rising temperatures and changing environmental conditions have been linked to the spread of insecticide resistance in mosquito populations, complicating malaria control efforts. A global survey found that Anopheles mosquitoes in Africa, Asia and South America have developed increased resistance to commonly used insecticides such as pyrethroids.

== History ==
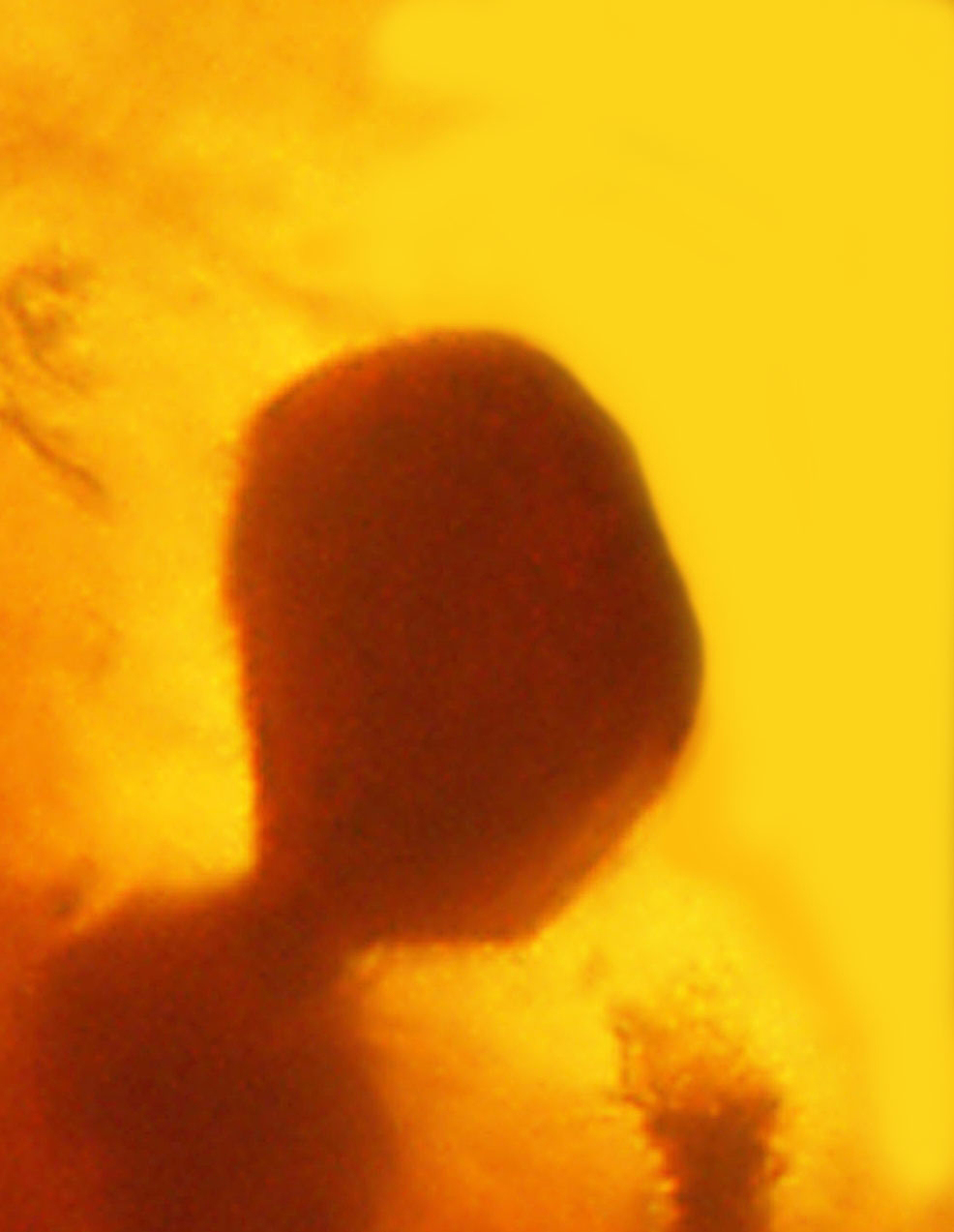
Ancient malaria oocysts preserved in Dominican amber

Although the parasite responsible for P. falciparum malaria has been in existence for 50,000–100,000 years, the population size of the parasite did not increase until about 10,000 years ago, concurrently with advances in agriculture and the development of human settlements. Close relatives of the human malaria parasites remain common in chimpanzees. Some evidence suggests that the P. falciparum malaria may have originated in gorillas.

References to the unique periodic fevers of malaria are found throughout history. The Roman Columella associated the disease with insects from swamps. Hippocrates described periodic fevers, labelling them tertian, quartan, subtertian and quotidian. Malaria may have contributed to the decline of the Roman Empire, and was so pervasive in Rome that it was known as the "Roman fever". Several regions in ancient Rome were considered at-risk for the disease because of the favourable conditions present for malaria vectors. This included areas such as southern Italy, the island of Sardinia, the Pontine Marshes, the lower regions of coastal Etruria and the city of Rome along the Tiber. The presence of stagnant water in these places was preferred by mosquitoes for breeding grounds. Irrigated gardens, swamp-like grounds, run-off from agriculture and drainage problems from road construction led to the increase of standing water.

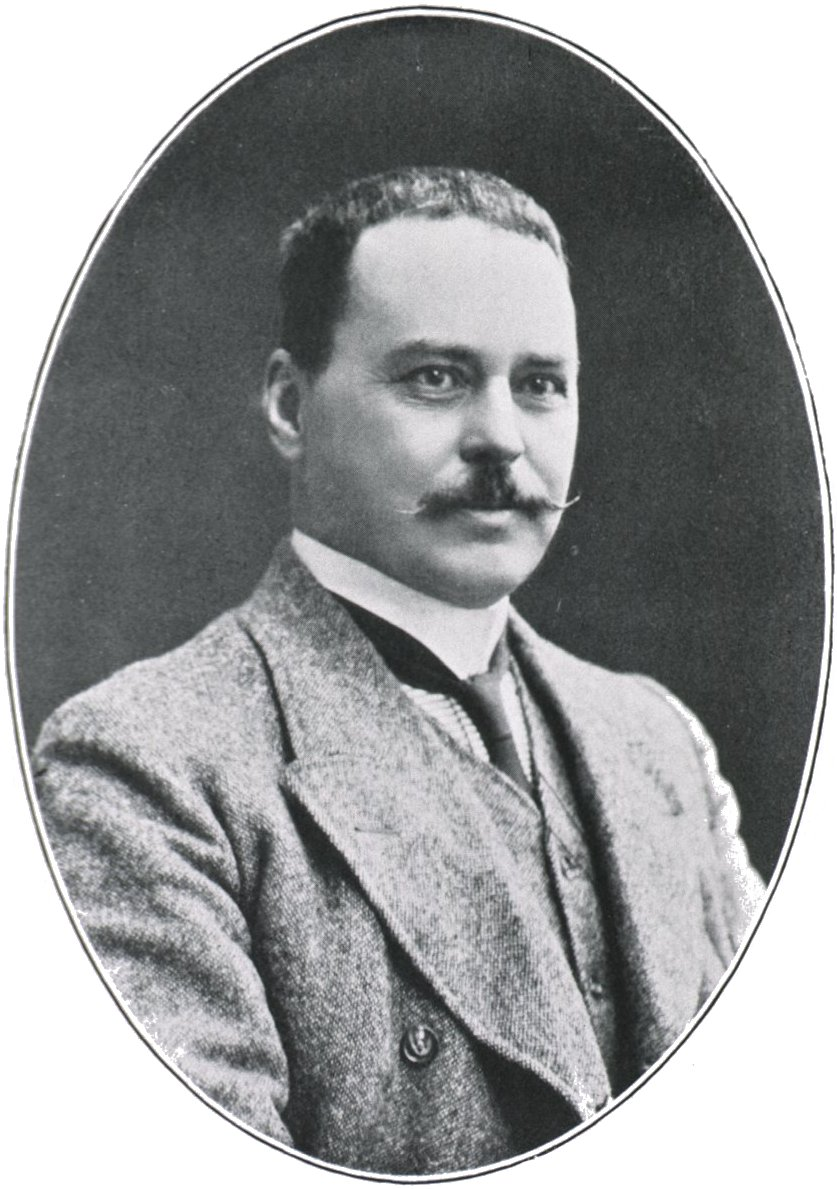
British doctor Ronald Ross received the Nobel Prize for Physiology or Medicine in 1902 for his work on malaria.

The few surviving medical records of Mesoamerican civilizations do not show any record of malaria. European settlers and the West Africans they enslaved likely brought malaria to the Americas starting in the 16th century.

Scientific studies on malaria made their first significant advance in 1880, when Charles Louis Alphonse Laveran—a French army doctor working in the military hospital of Constantine in Algeria—observed parasites inside the red blood cells of infected people for the first time. He, therefore, proposed that malaria is caused by this organism, the first time a protist was identified as causing disease. For this and later discoveries, he was awarded the 1907 Nobel Prize for Physiology or Medicine. A year later, Carlos Finlay, a Cuban doctor treating people with yellow fever in Havana, provided strong evidence that mosquitoes were transmitting disease to and from humans. This work followed earlier suggestions by Josiah C. Nott, and work by Sir Patrick Manson, the "father of tropical medicine", on the transmission of filariasis.

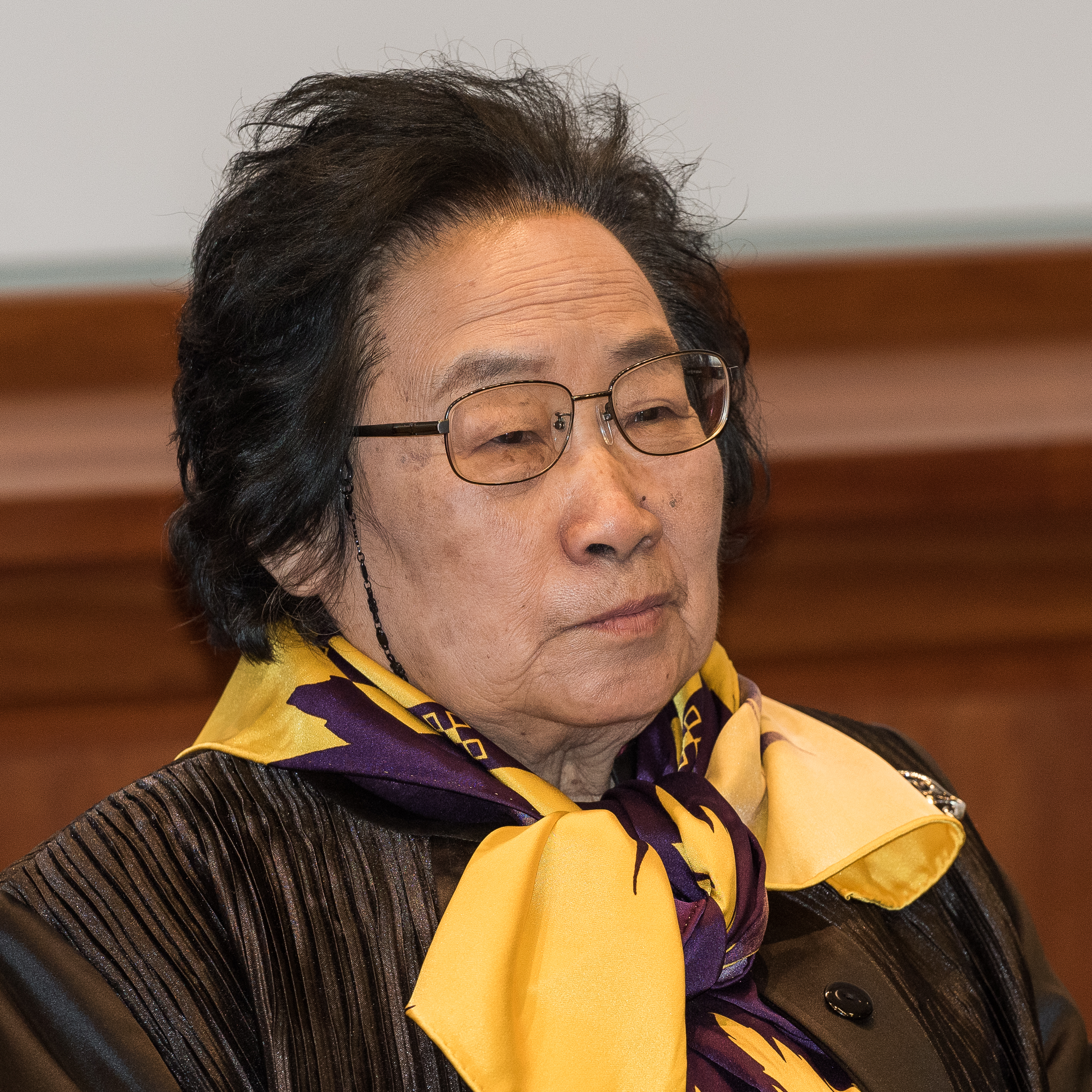
Chinese medical researcher Tu Youyou received the Nobel Prize for Physiology or Medicine in 2015 for her work on the antimalarial drug artemisinin.

In April 1894, a Scottish physician, Sir Ronald Ross, visited Sir Patrick Manson at his house on Queen Anne Street, London. This visit was the start of four years of collaboration and fervent research that culminated in 1897 when Ross, who was working in the Presidency General Hospital in Calcutta, proved the complete life-cycle of the malaria parasite in mosquitoes. He thus proved that the mosquito was the vector for malaria in humans by showing that certain mosquito species transmit malaria to birds. He isolated malaria parasites from the salivary glands of mosquitoes that had fed on infected birds. Ross received the 1902 Nobel Prize for Physiology or Medicine "for his work on malaria, by which he has shown how it enters the organism and thereby has laid the foundation for successful research on this disease and methods of combating it". After resigning from the Indian Medical Service, Ross worked at the newly established Liverpool School of Tropical Medicine and directed malaria-control efforts in Egypt, Panama, Greece and Mauritius. The findings of Finlay and Ross were later confirmed by a medical board headed by Walter Reed in 1900. Its recommendations were implemented by William C. Gorgas in the health measures undertaken during construction of the Panama Canal. This public-health work saved the lives of thousands of workers and helped develop the methods used in future public-health campaigns against the disease.

In 1896, Amico Bignami discussed the role of mosquitoes in malaria. In 1898, Bignami, Giovanni Battista Grassi and Giuseppe Bastianelli succeeded in showing experimentally the transmission of malaria in humans, using infected mosquitoes to contract malaria themselves which they presented in November 1898 to the Accademia dei Lincei.

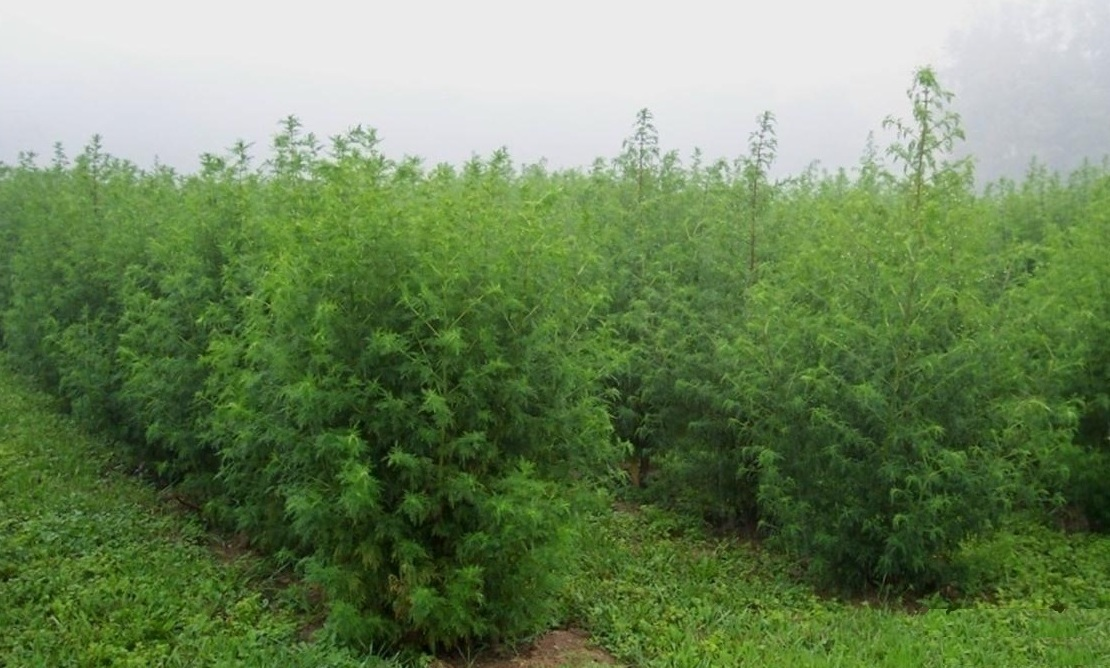
Artemisia annua, source of the antimalarial drug artemisinin

The first effective treatment for malaria came from the bark of cinchona tree, which contains quinine. This tree grows on the slopes of the Andes, mainly in Peru. The indigenous peoples of Peru made a tincture of cinchona to control fever. Its effectiveness against malaria was found and the Jesuits introduced the treatment to Europe around 1640; by 1677, it was included in the London Pharmacopoeia as an antimalarial treatment. It was not until 1820 that the active ingredient, quinine, was extracted from the bark, isolated and named by the French chemists Pierre Joseph Pelletier and Joseph Bienaimé Caventou.

Quinine was the predominant malarial medication until the 1920s when other medications began to appear. In the 1940s, chloroquine replaced quinine as the treatment of both uncomplicated and severe malaria until resistance supervened, first in Southeast Asia and South America in the 1950s and then globally in the 1980s.

The medicinal value of Artemisia annua has been used by Chinese herbalists in traditional Chinese medicines for 2,000 years. In 1596, Li Shizhen recommended tea made from qinghao specifically to treat malaria symptoms in his "Compendium of Materia Medica", however the efficacy of tea, made with A. annua, for the treatment of malaria is dubious, and is discouraged by the World Health Organization (WHO). Artemisinins, discovered by Chinese scientist Tu Youyou and colleagues in the 1970s from the plant Artemisia annua, became the recommended treatment for P. falciparum malaria, administered in severe cases in combination with other antimalarials. Tu says she was influenced by a traditional Chinese herbal medicine source, The Handbook of Prescriptions for Emergency Treatments, written in 340 by Ge Hong. For her work on malaria, Tu Youyou received the 2015 Nobel Prize in Physiology or Medicine.

Plasmodium vivax was used between 1917 and the 1940s for malariotherapy—deliberate injection of malaria parasites to induce a fever to combat certain diseases such as tertiary syphilis. In 1927, the inventor of this technique, Julius Wagner-Jauregg, received the Nobel Prize in Physiology or Medicine for his discoveries. The technique was dangerous, killing about 15% of patients, so it is no longer in use.

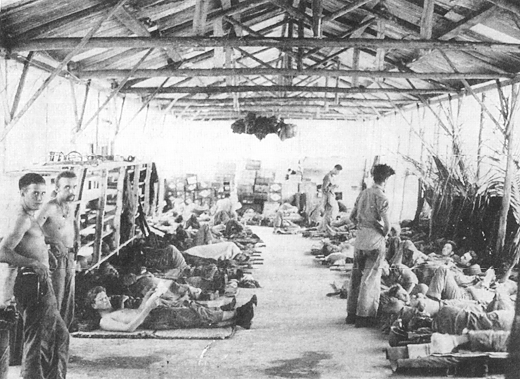
U.S. Marines with malaria in a field hospital on Guadalcanal, October 1942

The first pesticide used for indoor residual spraying was DDT. Although it was initially used exclusively to combat malaria, its use quickly spread to agriculture. In time, pest control, rather than disease control, came to dominate DDT use, and this large-scale agricultural use led to the evolution of pesticide-resistant mosquitoes in many regions. The DDT resistance shown by Anopheles mosquitoes can be compared to antibiotic resistance shown by bacteria. During the 1960s, awareness of the negative consequences of its indiscriminate use increased, ultimately leading to bans on agricultural applications of DDT in many countries in the 1970s. Before DDT, malaria was successfully eliminated or controlled in tropical areas like Brazil and Egypt by removing or poisoning the breeding grounds of the mosquitoes or the aquatic habitats of the larval stages, for example by applying the highly toxic arsenic compound Paris Green to places with standing water.

=== Terminology ===
The word malaria originates from Medieval Italian: mala aria, 'bad air', a part of miasma theory; the disease was formerly called ague, paludism or marsh fever due to its association with swamps and marshland. The word appeared in English at least as early as 1768. The scientific study of malaria is malariology.

=== Eradication efforts ===
There have been two major global malaria eradication efforts: the first, led by the World Health Organization between 1955 and 1969, and the second, initiated by the United Nations in the 21st century through the Millennium and Sustainable Development Goals. As of 2025, malaria has been eliminated or significantly reduced in many regions of the world, but remains widespread in others. Most of Europe, North America, Australia, North Africa and the Caribbean, along with parts of South America and Asia are now free from malaria, while much of the central part of Africa continues to experience high levels of transmission.

==== WHO program (1955–1969) ====
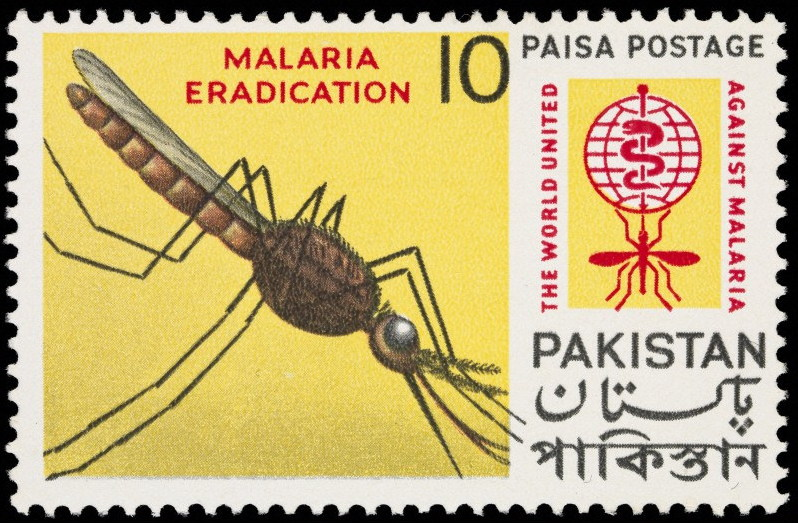
1962 Pakistani postage stamp promoting malaria eradication program

In 1955 the WHO launched the Global Malaria Eradication Program (GMEP). The program relied largely on DDT for mosquito control and rapid diagnosis and treatment to break the transmission cycle. The program eliminated the disease in "North America, Europe, the former Soviet Union", and in "Taiwan, much of the Caribbean, the Balkans, parts of northern Africa, the northern region of Australia, and a large swath of the South Pacific" and dramatically reduced mortality in Sri Lanka and India.

However, failure to sustain the program, increasing mosquito tolerance to DDT and increasing drug resistance (e.g. to chloroquine) led to a resurgence. In many areas early successes partially or completely reversed, and in some cases rates of transmission increased. Experts tie malarial resurgence to multiple factors, including poor leadership, management and funding of malaria control programs; poverty; civil unrest; and increased irrigation. Besides, the program barely managed to be implemented in sub-Saharan Africa, the region of the planet with the highest malaria burden.

WHO suspended the program in 1969 and attention instead focused on controlling and treating the disease. Efforts shifted from spraying to the use of bednets impregnated with insecticides and other interventions.

==== Roll Back Malaria Partnership ====
In 1998, a new major global initiative was launched: The Roll Back Malaria Partnership. However, it failed to secure adequate funding and reverse the upward trend in malaria deaths, which peaked in 2004.

==== 21st century ====
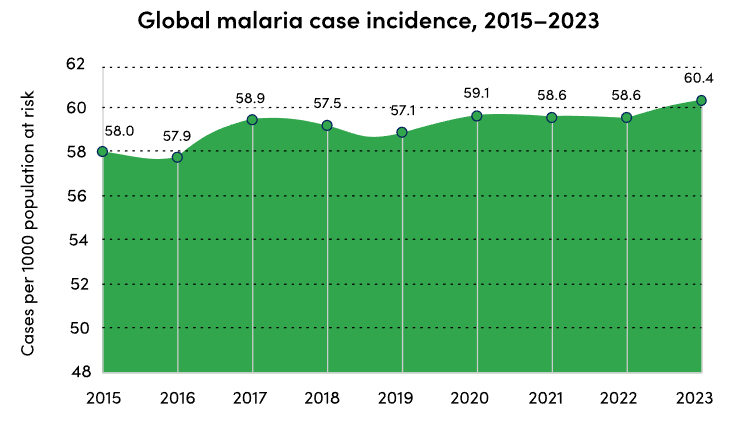
Global incidence of new cases of malaria from 2015 to 2023, expressed as cases per thousand in vulnerable populations. Source: WHO

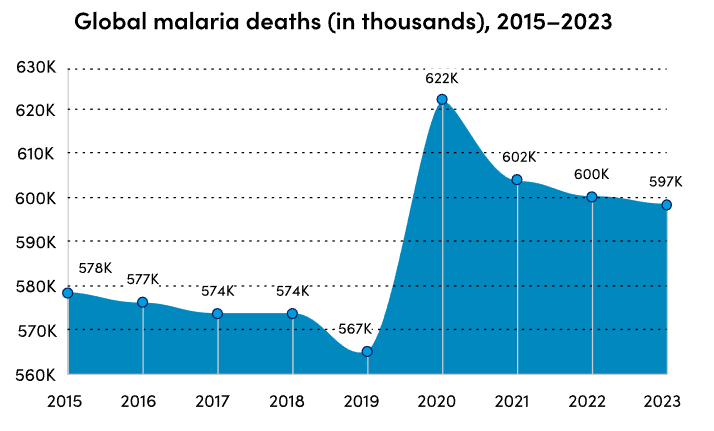
Global malaria deaths from 2015 to 2023 (in thousands). Source: WHO

At the start of the 21st century, several global initiatives renewed efforts to control and eventually eradicate malaria. In 2000, malaria control became a key objective of the United Nations Millennium Development Goals, followed in 2015 by the Sustainable Development Goals, which aim to end the malaria epidemic by 2030. From 2005 to 2014, global financing for malaria programmes rose sharply from about US $960 million to US $2.5 billion, largely driven by international donors and focused on the WHO African Region. This surge in funding, channelled through programmes such as the Global Fund to Fight AIDS, Tuberculosis and Malaria and Malaria No More supported an extensive scale-up of malaria control tools such as insecticide-treated nets, indoor spraying, rapid diagnostic tests and artemisinin-based combination therapies, though overall resources remained below the estimated US $5 billion needed annually to meet global targets.

Between 2004 and 2015, the global scale-up of malaria control led to a dramatic rise in insecticide-treated net deliveries to endemic countries, from 6 million to nearly 190 million per year, with more than a billion distributed overall. As a result, household access to such nets in sub-Saharan Africa increased from 7 percent in 2005 to about two-thirds by 2015, though universal coverage targets remained unmet. By 2014, coverage of preventive malaria treatment during pregnancy had increased, with more than half of eligible women receiving at least one dose. However, many opportunities to deliver treatment were missed, and preventive drug programmes for children and infants were adopted in only a few countries.

Between 2005 and 2014, diagnostic testing for malaria increased sharply, particularly in the WHO African Region, where testing of suspected cases in the public sector rose from 36 to 65 percent, largely due to the spread of rapid diagnostic tests. Over the same period, treatment practices improved, with the share of children under five receiving artemisinin-based combination therapies increasing from under 1 percent in 2005 to about 16 percent in 2015, while use of older antimalarial drugs declined. From 2000 to 2015, global malaria cases declined from about 262 million to 214 million, a reduction of roughly 18 percent, with the WHO African Region accounting for nearly nine out of ten infections. During the same period, malaria deaths fell by almost half, from an estimated 839 000 to 438 000, reflecting major progress toward international targets to reduce disease incidence and mortality.

By 2015, a growing number of countries had moved closer to eliminating malaria. The number of nations with fewer than 1,000 cases rose from 13 in 2000 to 33, and 16 countries reported no locally transmitted cases. That same year, the WHO European Region recorded zero indigenous infections for the first time, meeting the target set in the Tashkent Declaration.

The progress made until 2015 stalled thereafter. From 2015 to 2022, the rate of new cases remained broadly stable, followed by a slight rise in 2023 (see illustration), with sharp increases reported in Ethiopia, Madagascar and Pakistan. Malaria deaths fell steadily until 2019, rose sharply in 2020 as a result of COVID-19 disruptions, and then declined again in the following years. While malaria remained most deadly for young children, their share of overall deaths had fallen. Sub-Saharan Africa continues to account for 95% of global cases, with Nigeria, the Democratic Republic of the Congo, Uganda, Ethiopia and Mozambique together responsible for more than half.

This stalling from 2015 was due to a combination of environmental, humanitarian and biological challenges. Climate change created conditions that favored mosquito breeding and survival, with rising temperatures, shifting rainfall and frequent floods expanding transmission zones. In Pakistan, for example, the 2022 floods led to an eightfold increase in malaria cases within two years. Conflicts and resulting humanitarian crises have also disrupted health services and displaced millions of people into areas with little access to prevention or treatment. At the same time, growing resistance to both insecticides and artemisinin-based therapies has made malaria harder to control and treat. These overlapping pressures—climate change, conflict, displacement and resistance—have together undermined the progress achieved in earlier decades.

In 2021, the WHO Global Technical Strategy for Malaria was updated, proposing three consecutive priorities to be addressed as progress is made in reducing disease transmission. The first priority focuses on reducing morbidity and mortality by decreasing transmission, the second pursues malaria elimination through epidemiological surveillance of clinical cases and active case-finding, and the third seeks to consolidate achievements and prevent the resurgence of malaria once local transmission has been eliminated. This renewed global commitment aims to reach a world largely free of malaria by 2050.

== Society and culture ==
=== Economics ===
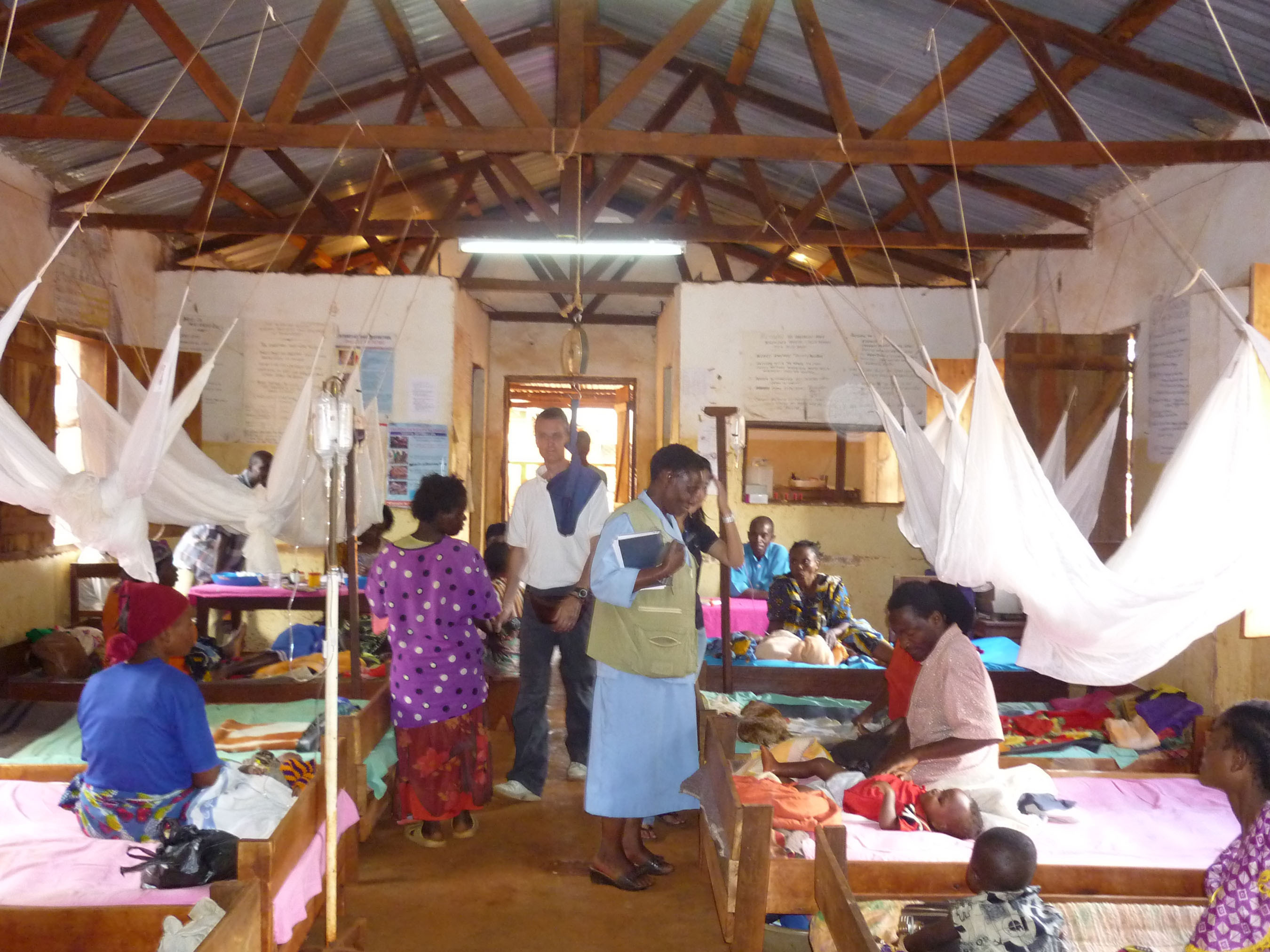
Malaria clinic in Tanzania

Malaria is not just a disease commonly associated with poverty; some evidence suggests that it is also a cause of poverty and a major hindrance to economic development.

A comparison of average per capita GDP in 1995, adjusted for parity of purchasing power, between countries with malaria and countries without malaria gives a fivefold difference (US$1,526 versus US$8,268). In the period 1965 to 1990, countries where malaria was common had an average per capita GDP that increased only 0.4% per year, compared to 2.4% per year in other countries.

Poverty can increase the risk of malaria since those in poverty do not have the financial capacities to prevent or treat the disease. In its entirety, the economic consequences of malaria has been estimated to cost Africa US$12 billion every year. This includes costs of health care, working days lost due to sickness, days lost in education, decreased productivity due to brain damage from cerebral malaria and loss of investment and tourism. The disease has a heavy burden in some countries, where it may be responsible for 30–50% of hospital admissions, up to 50% of outpatient visits and up to 40% of public health spending.

Cerebral malaria is one of the leading causes of neurological disabilities in African children. Studies comparing cognitive functions before and after treatment for severe malarial illness continued to show significantly impaired school performance and cognitive abilities even after recovery. Consequently, severe and cerebral malaria have far-reaching socioeconomic consequences that extend beyond the immediate effects of the disease.

=== Counterfeit and substandard drugs ===
Sophisticated counterfeits have been found in several Asian countries such as Cambodia, China, Indonesia, Laos, Thailand and Vietnam, and are a major cause of avoidable death in those countries. The WHO said that studies indicate that up to 40% of artesunate-based malaria medications are counterfeit, especially in the Greater Mekong region. They have established a rapid alert system to rapidly report information about counterfeit drugs to relevant authorities in participating countries. There is no reliable way for doctors or lay people to detect counterfeit drugs without help from a laboratory. Companies are attempting to combat the persistence of counterfeit drugs by using new technology to provide security from source to distribution.

Another clinical and public health concern is the proliferation of substandard antimalarial medicines resulting from inappropriate concentration of ingredients, contamination with other drugs or toxic impurities, poor quality ingredients, poor stability and inadequate packaging. A 2012 study found that roughly one-third of antimalarial medications in Southeast Asia and Sub-Saharan Africa failed chemical analysis, packaging analysis, or were falsified. A 2024 systematic review of African studies conducted between 2014 and 2024 found a lower but still substantial prevalence, with approximately 15.6% of sampled antimalarial medicines found to be substandard or falsified.

In February 2023 a United Nations report estimated that 267,000 deaths per year are linked to counterfeit or substandard medication in Africa alone.

=== War ===
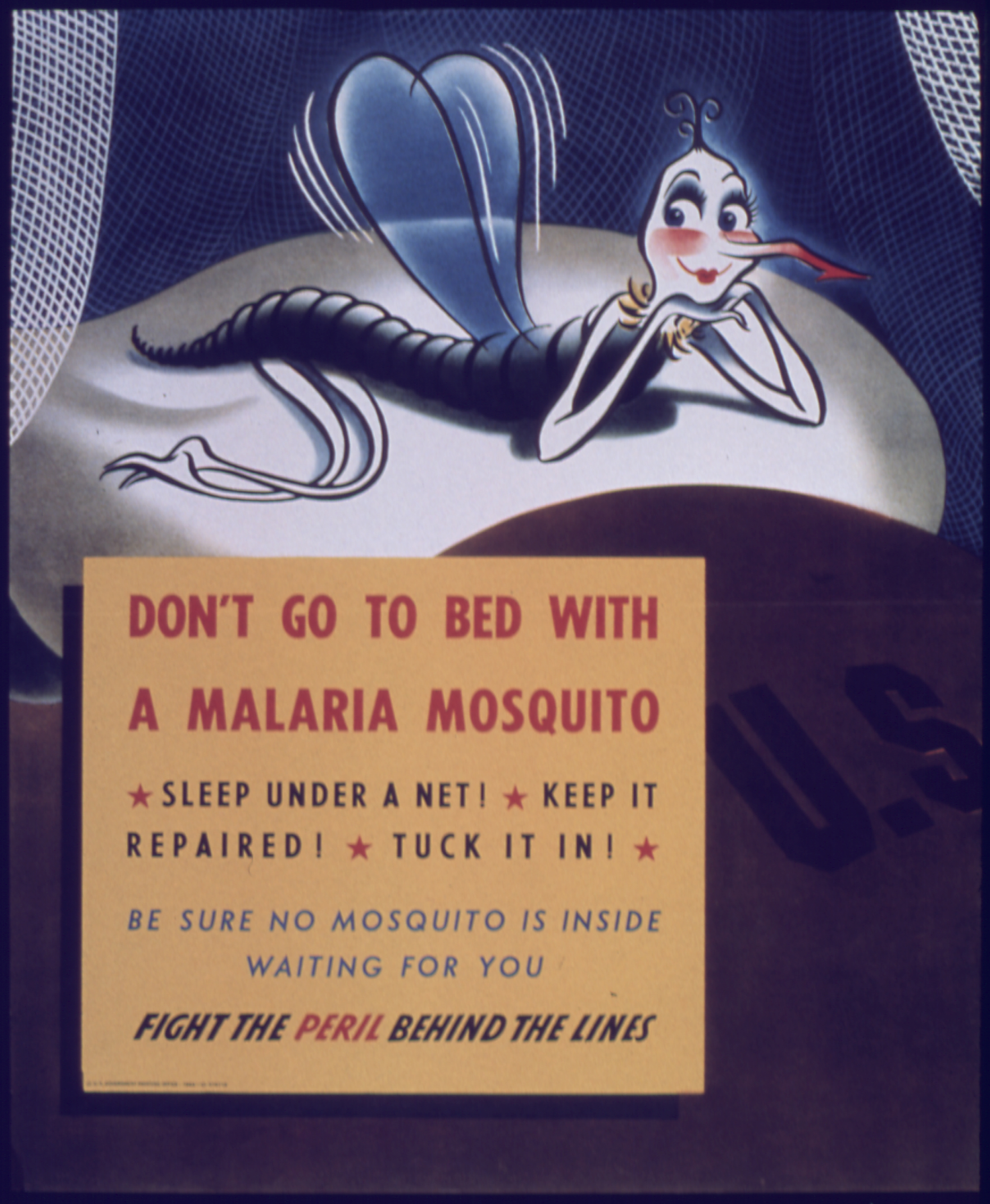
World War II poster

Throughout history, the contraction of malaria has played a prominent role in the fates of government rulers, nation-states, military personnel and military actions. In 1910, Sir Ronald Ross (himself a malaria survivor), published The Prevention of Malaria that included a chapter titled "The Prevention of Malaria in War". The chapter's author, Colonel C. H. Melville, Professor of Hygiene at Royal Army Medical College in London, addressed the prominent role that malaria has historically played during wars: "The history of malaria in war might almost be taken to be the history of war itself, certainly the history of war in the Christian era. ... It is probably the case that many of the so-called camp fevers, and probably also a considerable proportion of the camp dysentery, of the wars of the sixteenth, seventeenth and eighteenth centuries were malarial in origin." In British-occupied India the cocktail gin and tonic may have come about as a way of taking quinine, known for its antimalarial properties.

Malaria was the most significant health hazard encountered by U.S. troops in the South Pacific during World War II, where about 500,000 men were infected. According to Joseph Patrick Byrne, "Sixty thousand American soldiers died of malaria during the African and South Pacific campaigns." Malaria was a contributing factor to the U.S. surrender at Bataan in 1942.

During World War II, both Germany and the Axis powers suffered troop losses caused by malaria and committed resources to malaria prevention. In Germany, concentration camp inmates in Dachau and Buchenwald were used as guinea pigs for sometimes lethal experimental drug treatments. Early in 1942, the U.S. established a program called Malaria Control in War Areas (MCWA), "established to control malaria around military training bases in the southern United States and its territories, where malaria was still problematic". This organisation evolved into the present day Centers for Disease Control and Prevention.

== Research directions ==
=== Global coordination ===
The Malaria Eradication Research Agenda (malERA) was a project carried out in 2007 by the global scientific community to identify the steps and future research that must be done in order to eradicate malaria. It was created after the Malaria Forum in 2007, and resulted in a research and development agenda intended to complement ongoing research into malaria control by identifying knowledge gaps and tools needed for full eradications. In 2015, it was reviewed and updated under 6 headings: "basic science and enabling technologies, insecticide and drug resistance, characterizing the reservoir and measuring transmission, tools for elimination, combination interventions and modeling, health systems and policy research."

=== Vaccines ===
The search for a malaria vaccine started in the 1960s and is ongoing. As of February 2026, two malaria vaccines have completed clinical trials and are in use; they are RTS,S (Mosquirix) and R21/Matrix-MTM, both of which target the P. falciparum sporozoite; a further 25 clinical trials are in progress.

There are three main types of vaccine candidate. Pre-erythrocytic vaccines aim to block infection completely by incapacitating the sporozoite before it reaches the liver. Erythrocytic vaccines (blood-stage vaccines) aim to target the merozoite stage in the bloodstream; these have largely proved ineffective due to antigenic polymorphism of this stage of the parasite. Transmission-blocking vaccines aim to generate antibodies against the sexual stages of the parasite - gametes, zygotes and ookinetes. These either prevent transmission of the parasite from human to mosquito, or hinder the sexual stage of its life cycle within the infected mosquito.

=== Drugs ===
There are two aspects to drug research. As the parasite evolves to resist to existing drugs, there is an urgent need for new drugs. There is also ongoing research into existing drugs, to improve their effectiveness by testing drug combinations and dosage, and by improving diagnosis, availability and compliance in people who need them.

An element of the search for new drugs is finding novel mechanisms which can be targeted. There are many candidates - some of these include the parasite's proteasome, proteases and kinases.

=== Vector biology and control ===
This field of research looks at the mosquito vector, identifying and investigating the species which serve as vectors, as well as ways in which they can either be controlled, or prevented from harboring the parasite e.g. by genetic modification.

=== Socioeconomic research ===
Malaria is strongly linked to poverty. This field of research aims to investigate social and economic factors which obstruct eradication efforts. It includes studies on improving access to diagnostic tools and appropriate treatment in under-served regions. It is also important to understand and address community perceptions of malaria to improve the adoption of preventative measures like bed nets.

=== Early warning systems ===
Recent research has focused on integrating climate data into malaria surveillance systems to improve prediction and prevention of outbreaks. Climate-informed early warning systems use environmental data such as temperature, rainfall and humidity, combined with epidemiological and satellite data, to forecast malaria risk in specific regions. These systems allow public health authorities to implement targeted interventions, such as indoor residual spraying and distribution of insecticide-treated bed nets, before outbreaks occur.

Advances in modeling and artificial intelligence have further improved the accuracy of malaria predictions by incorporating real-time climate and environmental data. These approaches are increasingly used in malaria-endemic regions, particularly in sub-Saharan Africa, to support proactive disease control strategies. Ongoing research aims to refine these tools and integrate them into national health systems to enhance preparedness and reduce malaria burden.

=== Emerging technologies ===
Recent advances in genetic technologies offer new approaches to malaria control. One potential strategy is the genetic modification of mosquitoes using gene drive technologies, such as CRISPR-Cas9. Through CRISPR-Cas9 gene editing, scientists can introduce genes into mosquito populations that either make them resistant to Plasmodium parasites or enable population suppression, where mosquitoes are modified so that any progeny are sterile.

Gene drive technologies increase the probability that a modified gene will be inherited by offspring, allowing traits such as malaria resistance or sterility to spread rapidly through mosquito populations over generations. This rapid spread is driven by the short life cycle and high reproductive rate of Anopheles mosquitoes. They can complete development from egg to adult in approximately 10 to 14 days, with female mosquitoes laying 50–200 eggs at a time. While these approaches remain in early stages of development and raise ecological and ethical considerations, they present a promising strategy in addition to current interventions.

== Other animals ==
While none of the main four species of malaria parasite that cause human infections are known to have animal reservoirs, P. knowlesi is known to infect both humans and non-human primates. Other non-human primate malarias (particularly P. cynomolgi and P. simium) have also been found to have spilled over into humans. Nearly 200 Plasmodium species have been identified that infect birds, reptiles and other mammals, and about 30 of them naturally infect non-human primates. Some malaria parasites of non-human primates (NHP) serve as model organisms for human malarial parasites, such as P. coatneyi (a model for P. falciparum) and P. cynomolgi (a model for P. vivax). Diagnostic techniques used to detect parasites in NHP are similar to those employed for humans. Malaria parasites that infect rodents are widely used as models in research, such as P. berghei. Avian malaria primarily affects species of the order Passeriformes, and poses a substantial threat to birds of Hawaii, the Galapagos and other archipelagoes. The parasite P. relictum is known to play a role in limiting the distribution and abundance of endemic Hawaiian birds. Global warming is expected to increase the prevalence and global distribution of avian malaria, as elevated temperatures provide optimal conditions for parasite reproduction.

== Sources ==
- Guidelines for the Treatment of Malaria. World Health Organization. 2015. hdl:10665/162441. ISBN 978-92-4-154912-7.
- World Malaria Report 2022. World Health Organization. 2022. hdl:10665/365169. ISBN 978-92-4-006489-8.
