= Cytotrophoblastic shell =

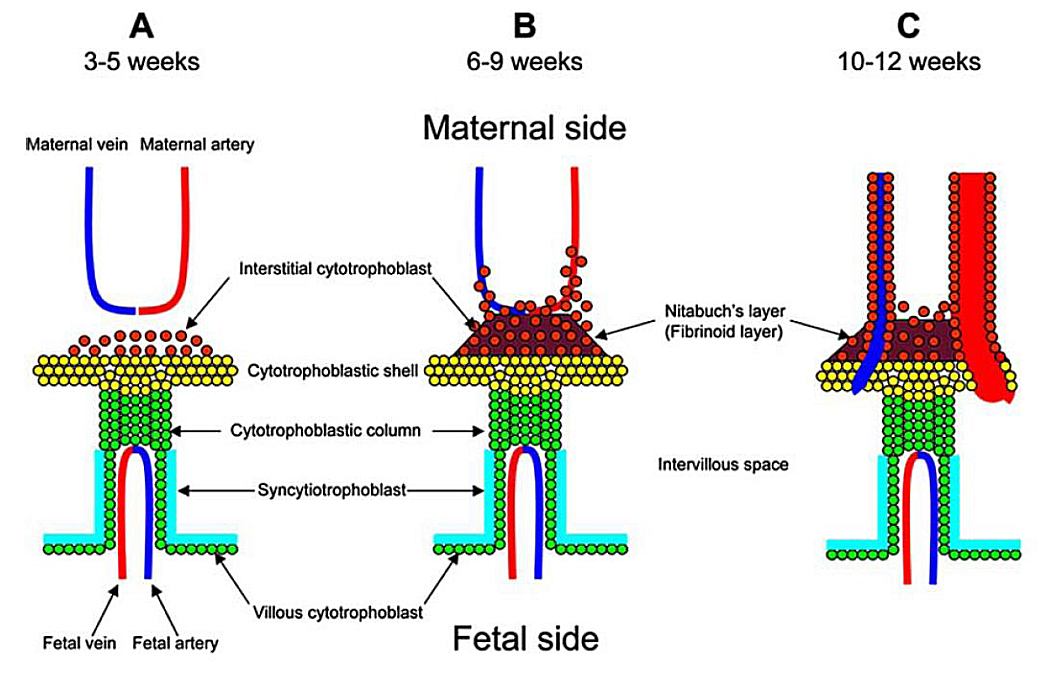
Intercommunication of maternal and fetal cells and vessels in the placenta.

The cytotrophoblastic shell is the external layer of cytotrophoblasts from the fetus that is found on the maternal surface of the placenta. The cytotrophoblastic shell firmly secures the placenta to the mother's endometrium called the decidua basalis. Gaps in the cytotrophoblastic shell allow endometrial arteries and veins to reach the intervillous space.

== Formation ==
A cytotrophoblast cap penetrates through the fetus' syncytiotrophoblasts and reaches the maternal decidua, forming the anchoring villus. The cytotrophoblast layer spreads and contacts the cytotrophoblast layers of neighboring anchoring villi, creating a continuous layer called the cytotrophoblastic shell. The cytotrophoblast structures of the anchoring villi that spread out are called cytotrophoblastic columns. Once formation is complete, the cytotrophoblast layer from the anchoring villi disappears, leaving behind a mesoderm core surrounded by syncytial cells.

== See also ==
- Cytotrophoblast
