= Pregnancy-associated malaria =

Impact of malaria on human pregnancies

Pregnancy-associated malaria (PAM) or placental malaria is a presentation of malaria in pregnancy which is life-threatening to both pregnant women and unborn fetuses. PAM occurs when a pregnant woman contracts malaria, generally as a result of Plasmodium falciparum infection, and because she is pregnant, is at greater risk of associated complications such as placental malaria. Placental malaria interferes with the transmission of vital substances through the fetal placenta, which can result in stillbirths, miscarriages, and dangerously low birth weights.

Prevention and treatment of malaria are essential components of prenatal care in tropical and subtropical geographic areas affected by malaria, and thus has received much international attention.

== Signs and symptoms ==
Symptoms of malaria include malaise, headaches, fatigue, fever, muscle aches, abdominal pain, nausea and vomiting. More severe cases may present with seizures and even coma. Women affected by PAM that have natural resistance to malaria may experience normal, mild, or no symptoms of malaria and therefore often will not seek proper medical care.

== Cause ==
=== Transmission ===
Transmission of malaria occurs when humans are bitten by mosquitos infected with the Plasmodium falciparum parasite, which enters the bloodstream as sporozoites. Over the next 7–30 days, the sporozites will convert to merozites in the liver and re-enter the bloodstream to infect erythrocytes.

=== Risk factors ===
Pregnant women and unborn fetuses are more susceptible to malaria infection due to the complications of pregnancy and the aggregation of erythrocytes around the placenta. Infected erythrocytes express the VAR2CSA variant of P. falciparum erythrocyte membrane protein 1 (PfEMP1) which allows them to bind to chondroitin sulfate A (CSA) on placental proteoglycans and accumulate in the intervillous spaces of the placenta, blocking nutrient flow and causing inflammation.

P. falciparum parasites have a specific tendency to accumulate near the placenta and interfere with its function. Women in their first pregnancy are most susceptible; in later pregnancies they can develop transcendent antibodies which reduce this risk. Those infected with human immunodeficiency virus (HIV) are also at greater risk of infection and associated symptoms due to the heightened parasite burden within the placenta during pregnancy.

== Mechanism ==
P. falciparum expresses proteins on the surface of parasite-infected erythrocytes (IE) helping them bind to an unusually low-sulfated form of chondroitin sulfate A (CSA) in the placental intervillous space. By this process, the parasite avoids being filtered through the spleen where it would be cleared from the bloodstream and killed. When selected in vitro for CSA-binding, the only upregulated gene expressed in the P. falciparum parasites was the var2csa gene. Parasite clones - where the var2csa gene was disrupted - lost the ability to adhere to CSA by blocking the binding of IE. Its protein, VAR2CSA (Variant Surface antigen 2-CSA), belongs to the Plasmodium falciparum erythrocyte membrane protein 1 (PfEMP1) family and contains six Duffy binding-like (DBL) domains. The regions that mediate binding to CSA have not been defined, but DBL2, DBL3, and DBL6 have shown the highest affinity for CSA binding when testing with recombinant single-domains.

A unique var gene (PFL0030c or var2csa) encodes this particular PfEMP1, which is differently regulated than other genes from the var family. It is also only expressed as protein in pregnant women, even though the transcript is present in children, men and non-pregnant women. It has a unique regulatory region, a uORF located upstream from the ORF that codes for the VAR2CSA protein. The expression of a protein named PTEF (after Plasmodium falciparum translation-enhancing factor) has been described to be necessary for the translation machinery to overcome the uORF and produce VAR2CSA protein, but the mechanism behind it remains to be elucidated.

== Maternal and fetal outcomes ==
In general, women with PAM have a higher likelihood of premature births and infants with low birthweight. In examination of possible malarial immunity, some studies have shown that the presence of "P. falciparum" antibodies (specifically CSA adhesion inhibitory antibodies or IgG antibodies) may decrease the likelihood of low birthweight in infants of women who have had pregnancy-associated malaria, but these findings do not specifically correlate to malarial immunity during pregnancy. However, the relationship between many P. falciparum antibodies during pregnancy and maternal and birth outcomes remains variable.

Lower birthweight of infants born from mothers with PAM can be attributed to placental infection, as well as other complications such as anemia and malnutrition, since the malarial parasite can be passed vertically from mother to infant via infected red blood cells. Children who are born with a birthweight below the mean are at risk for other health problems, including increased mortality risk.

Anemia is a great concern as an adverse effect of pregnancy-associated malaria, since it can be life-threatening to the mother. Its cause is often compounded by other factors, such as nutrition and genetics. Some studies have suggested that iron supplementation can help with maternal anemia, but more research on malaria-endemic regions is required to make a better recommendation for mothers with PAM.

One systematic review showed that children of women with PAM are also more likely to contract clinical malaria and P. falciparum parasitaemia, although the reasoning for this is uncertain.

During epidemics, maternal death is one of the biggest complications of malaria in some areas. Furthermore, its cause is compounded with other malarial complications, such as anemia.

== Prevention ==
Prevention of pregnancy-associated malaria can be done with the use of various antimalarial drugs given before or during pregnancy to susceptible populations. Some of the antimalarial drugs used include Chloroquine, Mefloquine, and Sulfadoxine/pyrimethamine since they are safe for use during pregnancy. For regions of moderate or high malaria risk, preventative measures include insecticide-treated nets (ITNs) and intermittent preventative treatment in pregnancy (IPTp). ITNs act as two layers of protection. One is from the physical net and another from the chemical nature and effects of the insecticide. Because IPTp plays a role in altering potential immune response displayed by infects, the World Health Organization recommends starting IPTp as soon as possible during the second trimester. These treatments are with doses of Sulfadoxine/pyrimethamine and are given at each antenatal visit, as long as the visits are one month apart. One concern with the use of Sulfadoxine/pyrimethamine along with other antimalarial drugs is P. falciparum developing resistance. In areas that have higher rates of resistance to the antimalarial Sulfadoxine/pyrimethamine, two doses of the drug is effective in reducing maternal parasitemia in women that do not have HIV while more doses are needed to reduce maternal parasitemia in HIV-positive women.

== Management ==
=== Non-pharmacological treatment ===
Non-pharmacological treatment of PAM consists of utilizing the Artemisia annua plant as an herbal remedy. This reasoning is based on the fact that A. annua acts as the plant source for Artemisinin-based combination therapy (ACT), a commonly used pharmacological treatment of PAM. However, the WHO currently does not support the use of A. annua as there are no standardization guidelines for plant harvest and preparation. Also, its clinical safety and efficacy have not yet been proven.

=== Pharmacological treatment ===
Treatment of PAM is highly dependant on the mother's current pregnancy stage (i.e. trimester) and the species responsible for the disease transmission.

For infection caused by P. falciparum, the WHO recommends a first trimester a treatment consisting of both Quinine and Clindamycin for a duration of 7 days. During the second and third trimester, the WHO recommendations of ACT, are the same as ones for non-pregnant individuals.

For infection caused by the other species, which include Plasmodium malariae, Plasmodium vivax, and Plasmodium ovale, the WHO recommends Chloroquine or Quinine during the first trimester. Quinine is used as an alternative if chloroquine-resistance is detected. During the second and third trimester, the WHO recommends either ACT or Chloroquine. If chloroquine-resistance is detected, ACT is the treatment of choice. The Centers for Disease Control and Prevention (CDC) has similar recommendations to the WHO.

== Epidemiology ==
Globally, an estimated 125 million or more pregnant women per year risk contracting PAM. Pregnancy-related malaria causes around 100,000 infant deaths each year, largely due to low birth weight.

Due to the nature of disease transmission (i.e. via mosquitoes) and life cycle of the parasite, malaria is prevalent in warm, humid climates, such as tropical and subtropical regions. Consistent with previous years, the incidence of malaria in general is greatest in African regions, specifically sub-Saharan Africa, as defined by the World Health Organization - (WHO) - although there was a decline in numbers from 2010 to 2018. Particularly, in 2018, the number of pregnancies in Central and West Africa with malarial infection reached around 35% of all pregnancies in those regions. The regions that follow Africa in terms of malaria cases are Southeast Asia and the Mediterranean, although Africa has the largest number of cases by far; these regions comprise over 90% of the global incidence of malaria.

In the realm of pregnancy, individual immunity and level of transmission by area play important roles in the malarial complications that manifest. For example, areas with high levels of transmission are also associated with higher incidence of immunity. Therefore, infection by P. falciparum is usually associated with no symptoms in pregnant women. However, it is not safe to conclude that the presence of P. falciparum is completely benign, as it has been associated with maternal anaemia. Specifically, in these settings, women in their first pregnancy are at greatest risk of complications that arise from P. falciparum. Similarly to P. falciparum, Plasmodium vivax (P. vivax), another malarial pathogen found primarily in Asia and South America, has also been associated with maternal anaemia and low birthweight. On the contrary, women who live in areas with lower transmission are at a very high risk of adverse malarial outcomes despite their number of pregnancies.

== Research directions ==
Each VAR2CSA domain has a potential affinity to CSA, but there are large areas not exposed to the immune system and appear to be buried in the quaternary structure. Data has indicated that these domains interact, forming a binding site that is specific for low-sulfated CSA found in the placenta. The binding of antibodies to one of these domains would prevent adhesion of parasitic IE in the placenta.

Moreover, studies have shown that women acquire immunity to PAM through antibody recognition of the VAR2CSA domain, also known as VSA_{PAM}, after exposure during their first pregnancy. By measuring circulating levels of IgG antibodies that presumably target VAR2SCA, the study demonstrated that subsequent pregnancies confer progressively greater protection to PAM. Thus, PfEMP1 proteins such as the VAR2CSA domain could prove attractive as potential candidates for vaccine targets.

Additional genetic testing relating to pregnancy-associated malaria is currently being researched which involves looking at glucose-6-phosphate dehydrogenase - (G6PD) - an enzyme responsible for keeping red blood cells protected from being destroyed too soon by foods, medications, etc. The gene for this enzyme is found on the X chromosome which means that women, in particular, can have G6PD function that is normal, intermediate (which often shows up on lab tests as normal) and deficient. This gene is important in determining if certain antimalarial drugs such as Primaquine and Tafenoquine can be used since these antimalarial drugs are more likely to cause red blood cell hemolysis (haemolysis) in women with a G6PD deficiency and worsen any anemia that results from malaria infection. Although these drugs would most likely be used after delivery for treatment of pregnancy-associated malaria, this type of genetic testing can help avoid inducing anemia in women more prone to red blood cell breakdown.

A vaccine to prevent a type of pregnancy-associated malaria called PAMVAC is currently undergoing clinical trials. PAMVAC is based on a recombinant form of the VAR2CSA domain and has been shown to be well-tolerated when injected in malaria-naive volunteers while also successfully inducing the production of antibodies in opposition against VAR2CSA. Although the vaccine was injected into participants who did not have malaria, the study provided insight into the vaccine's safety before administration into the target population – women with PAM.

A second vaccine candidate against pregnancy-associated malaria called PRIMVAC is also currently undergoing clinical trials in healthy adult women as a 3-dose course. This vaccine is based on the DBL1x-2x domain of VAR2CSA which is able to bind to CSA in the placenta. In preclinical studies, PRIMVAC injected into rats led to the production of antibodies against VAR2CSA on infected erythrocytes and also resulted in reduction of their binding to CSA. The vaccine was also shown to be well-tolerated in rats without any notable adverse reactions.
