= Endometrial arteries =

Arcuate arteries located in the uterus branch out and supply blood to different layers of the uterus. These arteries meet the myometrial-endometrial junction and lead to straight and endometrial arteries. The endometrium receives blood from endometrial arteries which are also called spiral arteries. Endometrial arteries proliferate rapidly and react to different hormones released. These hormones are progesterone and estrogen released by the ovaries and produced by the endocrine system. The endometrial arteries not only supply blood to the endometrium but are also important during pregnancy. They are the initial site of transportation of blood from the mother to the baby.

== Location of endometrial arteries ==
The uterus, part of the female reproductive system, is composed of the myometrium and the endometrium. The myometrium is made of smooth tissue and the endometrium lines the uterus. The endometrium is important in pregnancy because it is involved in the development of the placenta and it is where the fertilized egg implants itself during pregnancy. In the endometrium there are endometrial arteries which are also known as spiral arteries. The arcuate arteries located in the myometrium, branch out into the myometrium and then spread throughout endometrium forming endometrial arteries which is how the endometrium obtains blood. Endometrial arteries are coiled and is why they are also called spiral arteries. The spiral arteries are coiled towards the upper part of the endometrium and straight towards the base of the endometrium.

== Function of endometrial arteries during pregnancy ==
In the endometrium there are straight and spiral arteries. Straight arteries specifically branch to the base of the endometrium therefore supplying blood to the base of the endometrium. Spiral arteries supply blood to the rest of the endometrium. They grow rapidly, covering much of the space of the endometrium and end up coiled. When hormones levels are low, the endometrial arteries react by becoming narrow. Endometrial arteries supply blood to the endometrium but are also beneficial during pregnancy. When a female is pregnant a placenta develops. The baby receives blood, nutrients and oxygen via the umbilical cord which is attached to the placenta. Between the placenta and the myometrium are intervillous spaces where the endometrial arteries supply blood to. The placenta has villous trees which allow for blood to circulate and then be transported to the baby via the placenta.

== Other functions of endometrial arteries ==
Endometrial arteries are divided into the common ones and the arteriovenous anastomosis. The common ones are arteries that are homologous to the arteries of the rest of the body and they enrich the endometrium of the uterus. The joining of endometrial arteries and veins of the endometrium is known as arteriovenous. Endometrial arteries are also involved in the menstrual cycle. When the egg implants onto the endometrium and is not fertilized the endometrial arteries become narrow and the endometrium begins to disintegrate. This is when the endometrium sheds and results in menstruation.
