= Intervillous space =

Space in the placenta

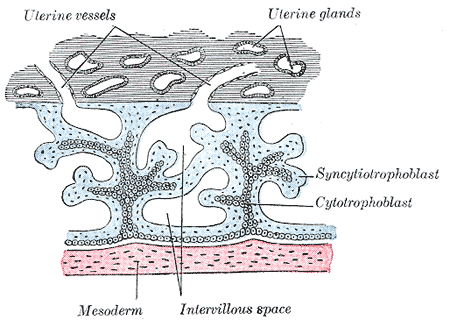
- Primary chorionic villi. Diagrammatic.

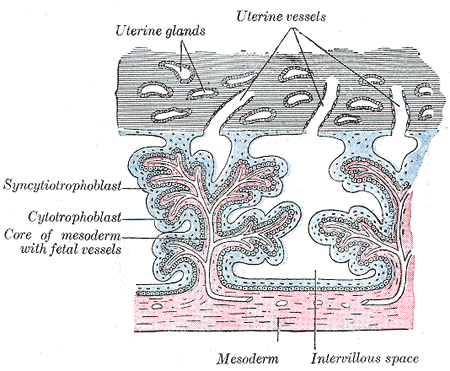
- Secondary chorionic villi. Diagrammatic.

Details
- Days: 24

Identifiers
- Latin: spatium intervillosum
- TE: space_by_E6.0.1.2.0.0.29 E6.0.1.2.0.0.29

In the placenta, the intervillous space is the space between chorionic villi, and contains maternal blood.

The trophoblast, which is a collection of cells that invades the maternal endometrium to gain access to nutrition for the fetus, proliferates rapidly and forms a network of branching processes which cover the entire embryo and invade and destroy the maternal tissues. With this physiologic destructive process, the maternal blood vessels of the endometrium are opened, with the result that the spaces in the trophoblastic network are filled with maternal blood; these spaces communicate freely with one another and become greatly distended and form the intervillous space from which the fetus gains nutrition.

Maternal arteries and veins directly enter the intervillous space after 8 weeks gestation, and the intervillous space will contain about a unit of blood (400–500 mL). Much of this blood is returned to the mother with normal uterine contractions; thus, when a woman has a cesarean section, she is liable to lose more blood than a woman who has a vaginal delivery, as the blood from the intervillous space is not pushed back toward her body during such a delivery.

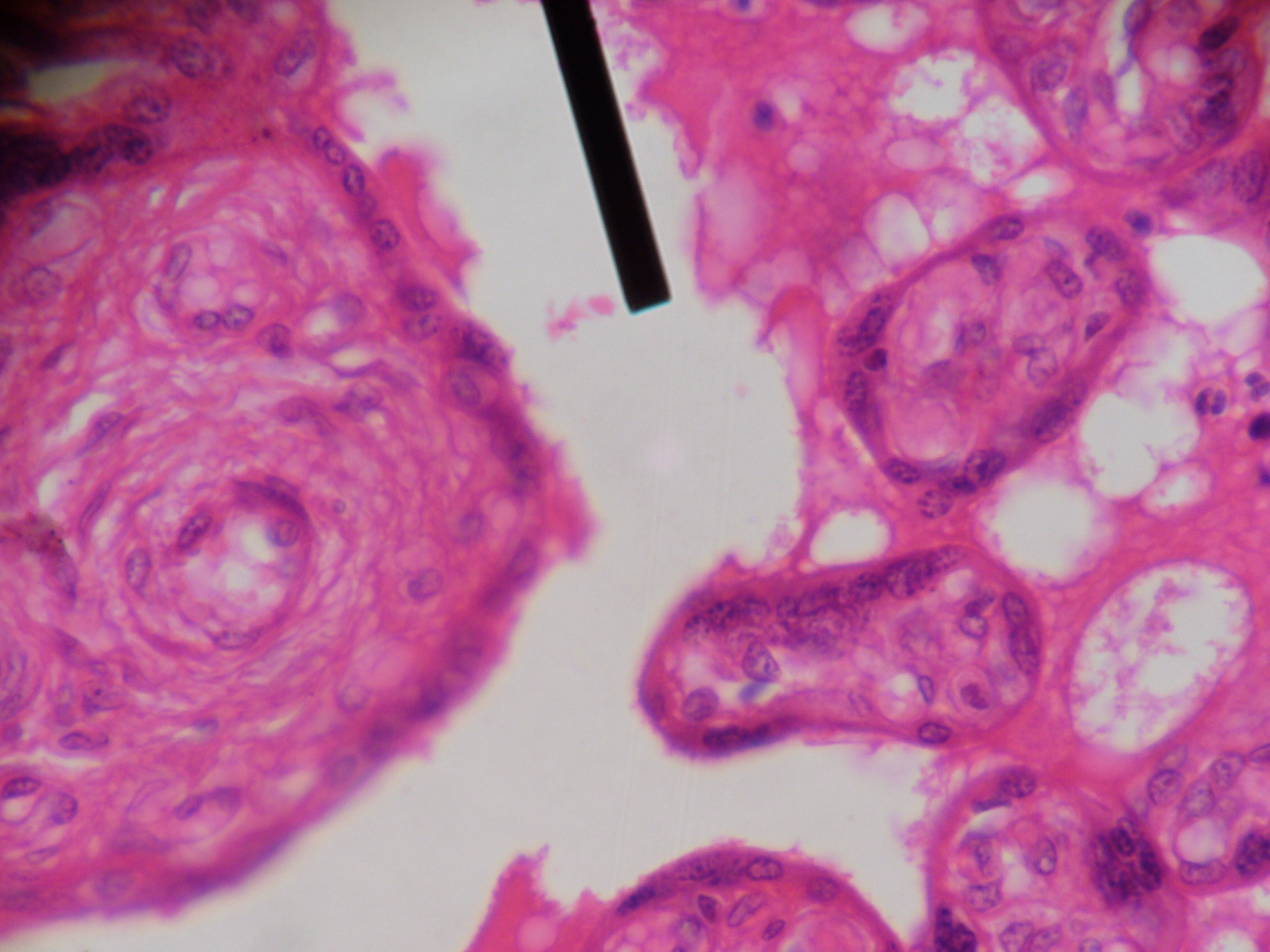
Intervillous space.
