= Lalji Singh =

Indian scientist

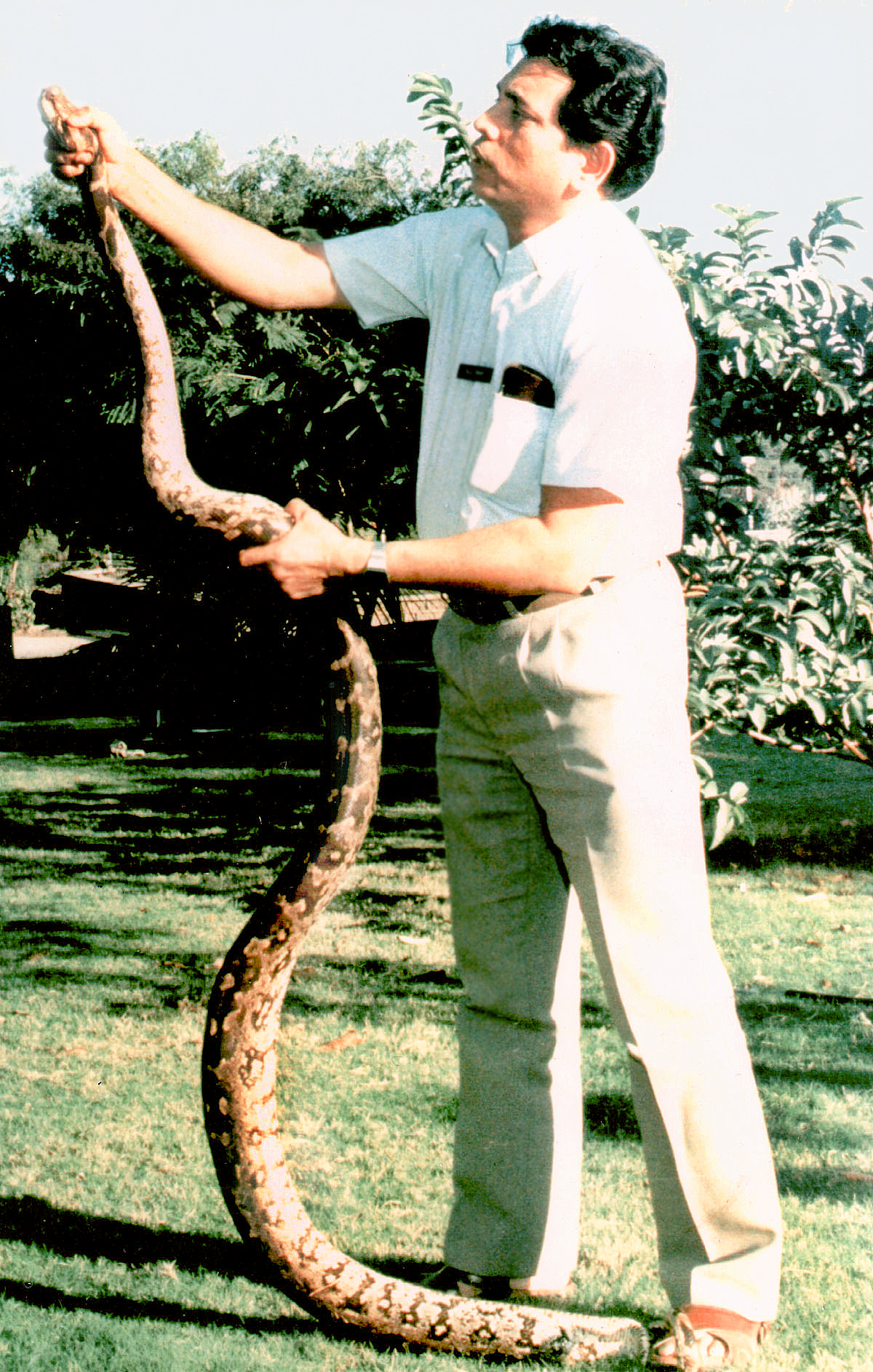
- Lalji Singh in 1992 with an Indian rock python
- Born: 5 July 1947; Jaunpur, United Provinces, British India
- Died: 10 December 2017 (aged 70); Varanasi, Uttar Pradesh, India
- Education: Banaras Hindu University
- Known for: Reforms as the Vice-Chancellor of Banaras Hindu University; Assisted reproductive technology; Artificial insemination; DNA fingerprinting; Wildlife Conservation; Molecular Sex Determination; Evolution & migration of human
- Spouse: Amarawati Singh
- Children: Abhishek Singh, Praveen Kumar Singh

25th Vice-Chancellor of Banaras Hindu University
- In office 21 August 2011 – 21 August 2014
- Appointed by: Pratibha Patil
- Preceded by: D.P. Singh
- Succeeded by: Girish Chandra Tripathi

Member of Board of Governors of IIT-BHU
- In office August 2011 – August 2014
- Appointed by: President of India

Director of Centre for Cellular and Molecular Biology
- In office May 1998 – July 2009
- Preceded by: Dorairajan Balasubramanian
- Succeeded by: Ch. Mohan Rao
- Scientific career
- Awards: INSA Medal (1974); Commonwealth Fellowship (1974); CSIR Technology Award (1992, 2008); Ranbaxy Research Award (1994); Goyal Prize (2000); FICCI Award (2002–03); Padma Shri Award (2004); J.C. Bose Fellowship (2006–2015); NRDC Award-2009; S. S. Bhatnagar Fellowship (2010–2014)
- Fields: Biotechnology; Cytogenetics
- Workplaces: Banaras Hindu University; University of Edinburgh; CCMB; CDFD
- Doctoral advisor: S. P. Ray-Chaudhuri

Lalji Singh (5 July 1947 – 10 December 2017) was an Indian scientist who worked in the field of DNA fingerprinting technology in India and pioneer of Assisted reproductive technology, where he was popularly known as the "Father of Indian DNA fingerprinting". Singh also worked in the areas of molecular basis of sex determination, wildlife conservation forensics and evolution and migration of humans. In 2004, he received the Padma Shri in recognition of his contribution to Indian science and technology.

Singh founded various institutes and laboratories in India, including the Centre for DNA Fingerprinting and Diagnostics in 1995, Laboratory for the Conservation of Endangered Species (LaCONES) in 1998, and Genome Foundation in 2004, aiming to diagnose and treat genetic disorders affecting the Indian population, in particular the under-privileged people residing in rural India.

Singh served as the 25th Vice Chancellor of Banaras Hindu University (BHU) and Chairman of Board of Governors of Indian Institute of Technology (BHU) Varanasi from August 2011 to August 2014. Before his term as Vice Chancellor of Banaras Hindu University, he also served as director of the Centre for Cellular and Molecular Biology (CCMB) from May 1998 to July 2009 and Officer on Special Duty (OSD) of Centre for DNA Fingerprinting and Diagnostics (CDFD), Hyderabad, India in 1995–1999.

== Early life and education ==
Lalji Singh was born and raised in a small village Kalwari in Jaunpur District of Uttar Pradesh, India. His father, Suryanarayan Singh, was a farmer and used to serve as head of the village. Singh underwent his primary education up to eighth standard at a government school in Kalwari. However, as there were no further education facilities in the village for senior classes, he was admitted at another school in the nearby village of Pratapganj 6–7 km (3.7–4.3 mi) from his village. After completing his 12th standard in the science group at school, he attended Banaras Hindu University to pursue his graduation in Zoology and cytogenetics.

== University education ==
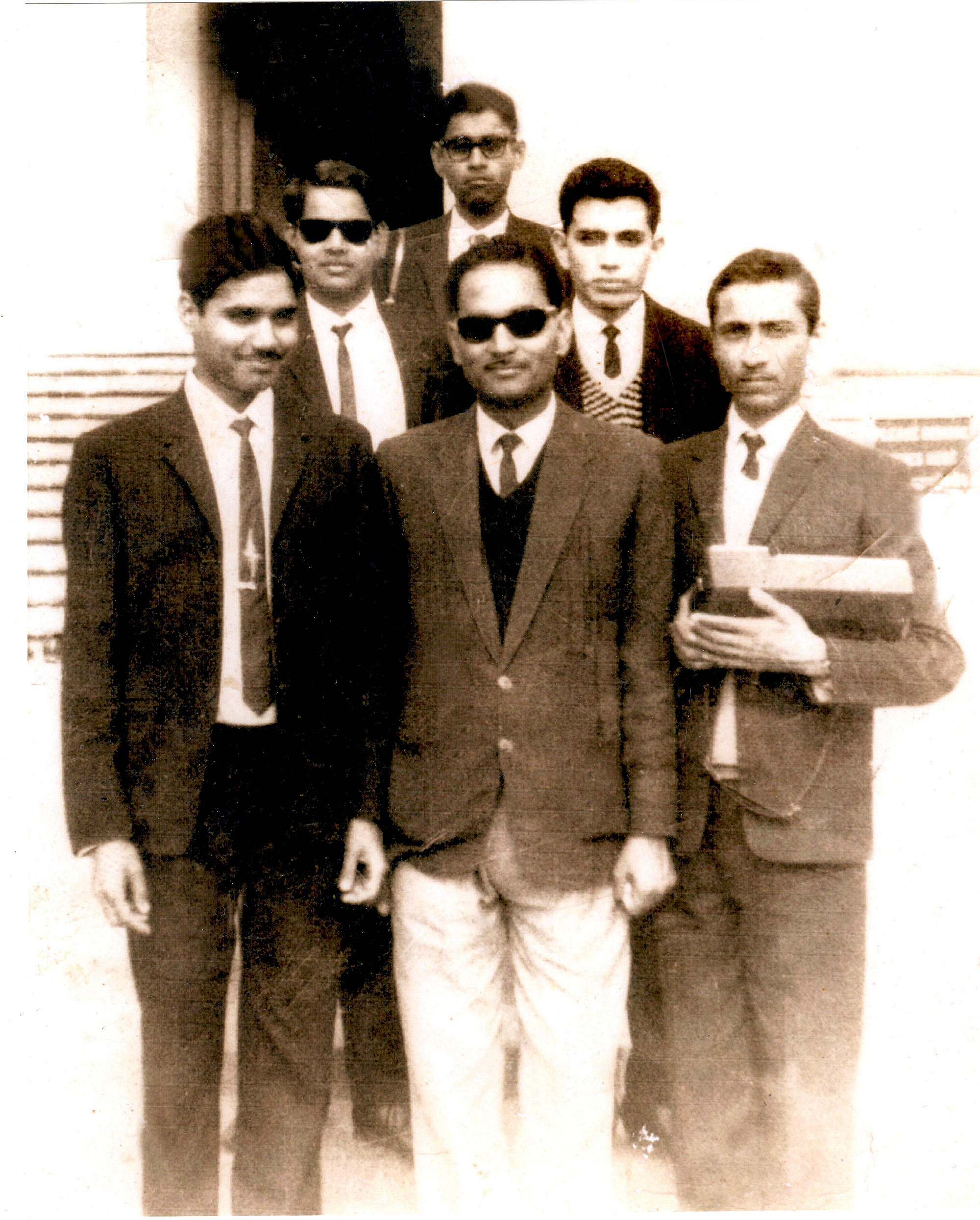
Lalji Singh (second from right) in 1968 at BHU, Varanasi, India

Singh obtained a B.Sc. degree in 1964 from the Banaras Hindu University (BHU). Singh scored the highest marks in his Master's degree class at BHU in 1966, and won the Banaras Hindu Gold Medal for standing first in order of merit. He was awarded a Junior Research Fellowship (JRF) by the University Grants Commission (India) in 1966. Singh then worked on his doctoral research at the Banaras Hindu University receiving a degree in 1971, for his work on "Evolution of karyotypes in snakes" in the area of cytogenetics under the guidance of professor S.P. Ray Chaudhuri. A summary of the findings from his doctoral research was published in Chromosoma. Singh received the INSA Medal for Young Scientists in 1974, for his research work in the field of cytogenetics.

== Research career ==
In 1971–72, Singh worked as a research associate at the Department of Zoology, University of Calcutta, and in April 1974, he was appointed as pool officer of CSIR. In 1974, Singh received the Commonwealth Fellowship to carry out research at the University of Edinburgh, UK, where he worked until 1987. During that time, Singh also worked as a guest scientist at the University of Calcutta, India, for a short period of time and visited the Australian National University in Canberra as a visiting fellow.

In June 1987, Singh returned to India and joined the Centre for Cellular and Molecular Biology (CCMB) in Hyderabad, as a senior scientist. Singh developed and established the DNA fingerprinting technology for forensic investigation of crime and civil disputes. In July 1998, Singh became the fourth director of the CCMB, where he served until July 2009. During April 2006 to July 2015, Singh was awarded the J. C. Bose National Research Fellowship of India. He was also awarded the Shanti Swarup Bhatnagar Fellowship of CSIR in January 2010 to December 2014. On 22 August 2009, Singh was appointed as the 25th Vice Chancellor of Banaras Hindu University in Varanasi, India. During his three-year tenure as vice chancellor at BHU, Singh took a ₹ 1 token salary from the university.

From 2014 Singh was associated with several academic and research organisations in various capacities. These included being a member of the Governing Board of Indian Council of Agricultural Research (ICAR), New Delhi; chairman of the Research Advisory Council (RAC) of National Bureau of Animal Genetic Resources (NBAGR), Karnal; chairman of the RAC of Project Directorate on Poultry (PDP), Hyderabad; member of the advisory committee of Pharmacopeia Commission of India; chairman of the RAC of National Bureau of Fish Genetic Resources (NBFGR), Lucknow; member of the Board of Management of Sri Ramachandra University, Chennai and member of the Board of Governors of Indian Institutes of Science Education and Research (IISER) Mohali. Singh also served as director of the Genome Foundation, a non-profit organization aiming to develop cheap molecular diagnostics for genetic disorders prevalent in rural India.

Singh published more than 230 research papers during his 45 years of research, and as of April 2013 he had an h-index of 30.

== Innovations and contributions to science and technology ==
=== DNA fingerprinting technology ===
During his early science career as a Masters student in 1968, Singh became interested in studying the cytogenetics of Indian snakes. During the 1970s, while studying the evolution of sex chromosome in a species of an Indian snake, the banded krait, Singh and his colleagues identified a highly conserved repeated DNA sequences in the banded krait and other vertebrates, which they named the "Banded Krait Minor" (Bkm) sequences in 1980. These Bkm sequences were conserved across various species and were found to be polymorphic in humans. In 1987 through 1988, while working in the CCMB, Singh established that this Bkm-derived probe could be used to generate individual specific DNA Fingerprints of humans for forensic investigations; and in 1988, he used that probe for the first time to solve a case of parentage dispute in India. In 1991, Singh produced the first DNA fingerprinting based evidence in an Indian Court to settle a disputed paternity. This was followed by DNA fingerprinting based resolution of hundreds of civil and criminal cases, including cases such as the assassination case(s) of Beant Singh and Rajiv Gandhi, Naina Sahni Tandoor murder case, Swami Premananda case, Swami Shraddhananda case, and Priyadarshini Mattoo murder case.

This established the DNA fingerprinting to be used as evidence in the legal system of India. Singh's work in this arena prompted the government of India's Department of Biotechnology to form an autonomous institution, the Centre for DNA Fingerprinting and Diagnostics (CDFD) in 1995, with the aim to provide DNA fingerprinting services to the country, especially for human identification purposes.

Singh's lifetime contributions for the development and establishment of indigenous DNA Fingerprinting Technology in India were recognized and he has been called the "Father of DNA fingerprinting" in India.

=== Wildlife conservation and forensics ===
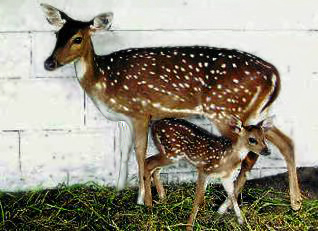
A spotted deer fawn born out of first successful artificial insemination in India at LaCONES on 14 March 2006

While serving as director of CCMB, Singh realized an urgent need for assessment and conservation of the wildlife resources of India. To address that need, he conceptualized the Laboratory for conservation of endangered species (LaCONES) in 1998. The foundation stone of this laboratory was laid by the Minister of Environment and Forests, Government of India on 16 September 2001. On 2 February 2007, the laboratory was inaugurated and dedicated to the nation by then President of India A.P.J. Abdul Kalam.

LaCONES serves as a research laboratory for the conservation and preservation of wildlife resources using advanced technological interventions; and also the "National Wildlife Forensic Cell" to provide wildlife identification services for the nation, based on the fundamental discovery of universal primer technology made by Sunil Kumar Verma and Singh (2001). The first DNA-based test for establishing the species identity of an unknown biological sample pertaining to a case of wildlife crime, was conducted in that laboratory in 2000. Since then, the laboratory has undertaken thousands of such cases on a routine basis for the entire country and has revitalized the field of wildlife forensics.

The laboratory recorded a major success in the Assisted reproductive technology (ART) of wild animals, when the world's first successful artificial insemination of an in estrus induced spotted deer, by non-surgical intra-vaginal insemination done in the laboratory, led to the birth of a live fawn on 14 March 2006. This achievement was further followed by an artificial insemination (AI) assisted birth of an Indian blackbuck fawn in August 2007. These were the first reports in the world of such successful AI of wild animals.

On the World Heritage Day in 2013, the LaCONES campus was recognized as a "Heritage Monument" by the Indian National Trust for Art and Culture (Intach) for its notable architecture and design.

=== Molecular basis of sex determination ===
In 1982, Singh and his colleagues discovered that a tiny portion of the short arm of sex-determining Y chromosome was necessary and sufficient to convert a female mouse to male. This fundamental discovery provided a new concept of Chromosomal translocation of sex-determining region from Y chromosome to X chromosomes causing sex reversal in mice. These findings later became the foundation for the discovery of a similar phenomenon of sex reversal in humans.

=== DNA-based molecular diagnostics ===
Until 1998, India did not have an adequate facility for diagnosis of genetic disorders, prevalent in the country. The fundamental research carried out by Singh and his colleagues in that area, led to conceptualization and establishment of the first DNA based diagnostic laboratory in the country. The lab later evolved into a separate institute, the Centre for DNA Fingerprinting and Diagnostics in Hyderabad, India to provide advanced DNA based molecular diagnostics services for the nation.

=== Novel insights into evolution and migration of humans ===
The fundamental DNA-based research carried out by Singh and his colleagues on primitive tribes including the tribal population of the Andaman and Nicobar Islands, provided critical insights into the evolution and migration of humans, suggesting the out of Africa route of modern humans about 60,000 years ago to the Andaman Islands. These findings have furthered the scientific community's understanding of the origin of man in terms of evolution and migration from place to place.

=== Genome Foundation ===
In 2004, Singh founded a non-profit research and service organization, the Genome Foundation, with the aim of diagnosing and treating genetic disorder affecting the Indian population, in particular the under-privileged people residing in rural India, with the participation and voluntary services of scientists and professionals.

== Death ==
Lalji Singh died in Varanasi, India following a heart attack on 10 December 2017 at the age of 70. He complained of chest pain when he reached the Lal Bahadur Shastri Airport to board a flight for Delhi. He was taken to the Banaras Hindu University (BHU) Trauma Centre from there but he could not be saved.

== Books by Singh ==
- You Deserve, We Conserve (ISBN 9788189866242) (2007)
- Scientoonic tell-tale of Genome and DNA (ISBN 9788189866600 (2007)
- DNA Fingerprinting: the Witness within (ISBN 9789380026909), (2012)
- My travails in the Witness Box (ISBN 9789380578873), (2012)

== Awards and honors ==
Singh holds fellowships from several Indian and Foreign academies. These include:

- Fellow of Indian Academy of Sciences (FASc), (elected in 1989)
- Fellow of The National Academy of Sciences, India (FNASc), (elected in 1991)
- Fellow of Indian National Science Academy (FNA) (elected in 1993)
- Fellow of Andhra Pradesh Akademi of Sciences (elected in 2000)
- Fellow of National Academy of Agricultural Sciences (FAAS) (elected in 2001)
- Fellow of National Academy of Medical Sciences (FAMS) (elected in 2002)
- Fellow of Third World Academy of Sciences (FTWAS) (elected in 2002)

Some of the notable awards conferred to Singh are as follows:

- Indian National Science Academy Medal for Young Scientists, (1974)
- Commonwealth Fellowship, (1974–1976)
- CSIR Technology Award (Twice: 1992 and 2008; The 2008 Award was jointly conferred to Verma and Singh),
- Ranbaxy research Award (1994)
- Goyal Prize in Life Sciences (2000)
- Vigyan Gaurav Award (2003)
- FICCI Award (2002–03)
- The New Millennium Plaques of Honour, (2002), for services in the field of biological sciences from the Prime Minister of India at the 89th Session of the Indian Science Congress.
- JC Bos National Fellowship (2006)
- CSIR Bhatnagar Fellowship (2009)
- NRDC Meritorious Invention Award (2009), jointly conferred to Verma and Singh),
- Biospectrum Life Time Achievement Award (2011).
- The Padma Shri, (2004), in recognition of his contributions to Indian science and technology.

Singh has also been awarded "Honorary D.Sc. degree" by six Universities including the Banaras Hindu University.

== Selected publications ==
- Chromosomes and classification of the snakes of the family Boidae
- Sex Chromosome associated satellite DNA: Evolution and conservation
- Sex reversal in the mouse (Mus musculus) is caused by a recurrent nonreciprocal crossover involving the X and an aberrant Y chromosome
- The conserved nucleotide sequences of Bkm, including those, which define Sxr in the mouse, are transcribed
- Bkm sequences are polymorphic in humans and are clustered in pericentric regions of various acrocentric chromosomes including the Y
- DNA profiling and its applications
- Novel universal primers establish identity of an enormous number of animal species for forensic application
- Reconstructing the origin of Andaman Islanders
- A common MYBPC3 (cardiac myosin binding protein C) variant associated with cardiomyopathies in South Asia
- Ancient human genomes suggest three ancestral populations for present day Europeans

Academic offices
Preceded by Dr. Balasubramanian	Director of Centre for Cellular and Molecular Biology; May 1998 – July 2009	Succeeded by Dr. Ch. Mohan Rao
Preceded by D. P. Singh	Vice Chancellor of Banaras Hindu University; August 2011 – August 2014	Succeeded by Prof. G. C. Tripathi
