= Satish Dhawan =

Indian mathematician and engineer (1920–2002)

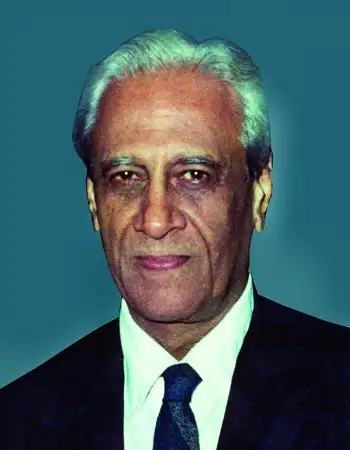
- Official Portrait

3rd Chairman of ISRO
- In office 1972–1984
- Preceded by: M. G. K. Menon
- Succeeded by: Udupi Ramachandra Rao

Personal details
- Born: 25 September 1920 Srinagar, Jammu and Kashmir, British India (Present-day Jammu and Kashmir, India)
- Died: 3 January 2002 (aged 81) Bengaluru, Karnataka, India
- Education: University of the Punjab (BA, MA); Punjab Engineering College (BE); University of Minnesota (MS); California Institute of Technology (PhD)
- Known for: Indian space programme
- Awards: Padma Bhushan (1971) Padma Vibhushan (1981)
- Scientific career
- Fields: Mechanical and aerospace Engineering
- Workplaces: Indian Space Research Organisation; Indian Institute of Science; California Institute of Technology; National Aerospace Laboratories
- Thesis: Direct Measurements of Skin Friction (1951)
- Doctoral advisor: Hans W. Liepmann

Signature
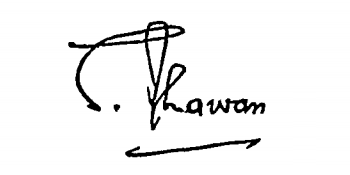

Satish Dhawan (25 September 1920 – 3 January 2002) was an Indian mathematician and aerospace engineer. He served as the chairman of ISRO from 1972 to 1984 and is often regarded as the father of experimental fluid dynamics research in India.

Born in Srinagar, Dhawan was educated in India and further on in United States. Dhawan was one of the most eminent researchers in the field of turbulence and boundary layers, leading the successful and indigenous development of the Indian space programme.The second launch pad of ISRO, Satish Dhawan Space Centre is named after him. He is greatly regarded as the man behind A. P. J. Abdul Kalam.

== Early life ==
Dhawan was born on 25 September 1920 in Srinagar in the princely state of Jammu and Kashmir (present-day Jammu and Kashmir, India). His father, Devi Dayal Dhawan, had migrated from Dera Ismail Khan to Srinagar.

Satish Dhawan grew up in Srinagar and Lahore. His father, Rai Bahadur Devi Dayal, was an MSc and LLB who joined the Punjab Civil Service and later became a sessions and district judge.

== Education ==
Dhawan was a graduate of what is now called Punjab Engineering College in the city of Chandigarh in India, the Mughalpura Technical College in Lahore, Pakistan, British India, where he completed a Bachelor of Science in physics and mathematics, a bachelor's degree in Mechanical Engineering and a Master of Arts in English literature. In 1947, he completed a Master of Science degree in aerospace engineering from the University of Minnesota, Minneapolis, and an aeronautical engineering degree from the California Institute of Technology followed by a double PhD in mathematics and aerospace engineering under the supervision of his advisor Hans W. Liepmann in 1951.

== Leadership in space research ==
In 1972, Dhawan became chairman of the Indian Space Research Organisation (ISRO) and secretary to the Government of India at the Department of Space.

APJ Abdul Kalam explained that in 1979 when he was the director of a Satellite Launch Vehicle, the mission failed to launch the satellite in the orbit. Instead, it was put into the Bay of Bengal. Abdul Kalam's team knew that there was a leakage in the fuel of the system, but they hoped that the leakage was negligible, and thus they thought there was enough fuel in the system. This miscalculation led to the mission's failure. Satish Dhawan, being the chairman at the time, called Abdul Kalam and conveyed to the press; "We failed! But I have very strong trust in my team and I believe that next time we will definitely succeed". This surprised Abdul Kalam, as the blame of the failure was taken by the chairman of ISRO. The next mission was prepared and launched successfully in 1980. When this succeeded, Satish Dhawan told Abdul Kalam to attend the press meet without his presence. It was observed that when the team failed, he took the blame. But when the team succeeded, he attributed the success to his team, thus portraying the picture of an ideal leader.

Satish Dhawan was chairman of ISRO until 1984.

== Director, IISc (1962–1981) ==
In 1951, Dhawan joined as faculty at the Indian Institute of Science (IISc), Bangalore and became its director in 1962. Although he was the head of the Indian space programme, he devoted substantial efforts towards boundary layer research. His most important contributions are presented in the seminal book Boundary Layer Theory by Hermann Schlichting. He set up the country's first supersonic wind tunnel at IISc. He also pioneered research on relaminarization of separated boundary layer flows, three-dimensional boundary layers and trisonic flows.

== Support of space research ==
Dhawan carried out pioneering experiments in rural education, remote sensing and satellite communications. His work resulted in operational systems including INSAT, a telecommunications satellite; IRS, an Indian Remote Sensing satellite; and the Polar Satellite Launch Vehicle (PSLV), which established India as a space-faring country.

== Honours ==
Dhawan died on 3 January 2002 in Bangalore. In honor of his contributions, the satellite launch center in Sriharikota, Andhra Pradesh, was renamed the Satish Dhawan Space Centre following his death. Satish Chander Dhawan Government College For Boys in Ludhiana is named after him.The Department of Mechanical Engineering Building at the Indian Institute of Technology, Ropar is also named in his honor as the Satish Dhawan Block. In 2019, the Uttar Pradesh Textile Technology Institute in Kanpur named its computer center the Prof. Satish Dhawan Computer Centre.

== Career ==
- Indian Institute of Science, Bangalore

- Senior scientific officer, 1951
- Professor and head of the Department of Aeronautical Engineering, 1955
- Director, 1962–1981

- California Institute of Technology, US

- Visiting Professor, 1971–72

- National Aerospace Laboratories, Bangalore

- Chairman, Research council, 1984–93

- Indian Academy of Sciences

- President, 1977–1979

- Indian Space Research Organisation

- Chairman, 1972–1984

- Indian Space Commission

- Chairman, 1972–2002

== Awards ==
- Padma Vibhushan (India's second highest civilian honour), 1981
- Padma Bhushan (India's third highest civilian honour), 1971
- Indira Gandhi Award for National Integration, 1999
- Distinguished Alumnus Award, Indian Institute of Science
- Distinguished Alumnus Award, California Institute of Technology, 1969

== Personal life ==
He was married to Nalini Dhawan, a cytogeneticist, and his daughter Jyotsna Dhawan is serving as senior principal scientist in the Centre for Cellular and Molecular Biology.

== Works ==
- 1953: "Direct measurements of skin friction", Technical Report 1121, National Advisory Committee for Aeronautics, Washington DC.
- 1958; "Some properties of boundary layer flow during the transition from laminar to turbulent motion", Journal of Fluid Mechanics 3(4): 418 – 36 doi:10.1017/S0022112058000094
- 1967: "Aeronautical Research in India", (22nd British Commonwealth Lecture), Journal of the Royal Aeronautical Society 71: 149-184.
- 1982: "A glimpse of fluid mechanics research in Bangalore 25 years ago", in India: Surveys in fluid mechanics, Indian Academy of Sciences (Eds. R Narasimha, S M Deshpande) 1-15.
- 1988: Developments in Fluid Mechanics and Space Technology, (Eds. R Narasimha, APJ Abdul Kalam) Indian Academy of Sciences.
- 1991: "Bird flight", Sadhana Proceedings in Engineering Sciences, Indian Academy of Sciences.
- 2000: Special Section on Instabilities, transitions and turbulence, (Ed. R Narasimha) Current Science 79: 725-883.

Government offices
Preceded by M. G. K. Menon	ISRO Chairman; 1972–1984	Succeeded by U. R. Rao
