= Manjula Reddy =

Indian bacterial geneticist

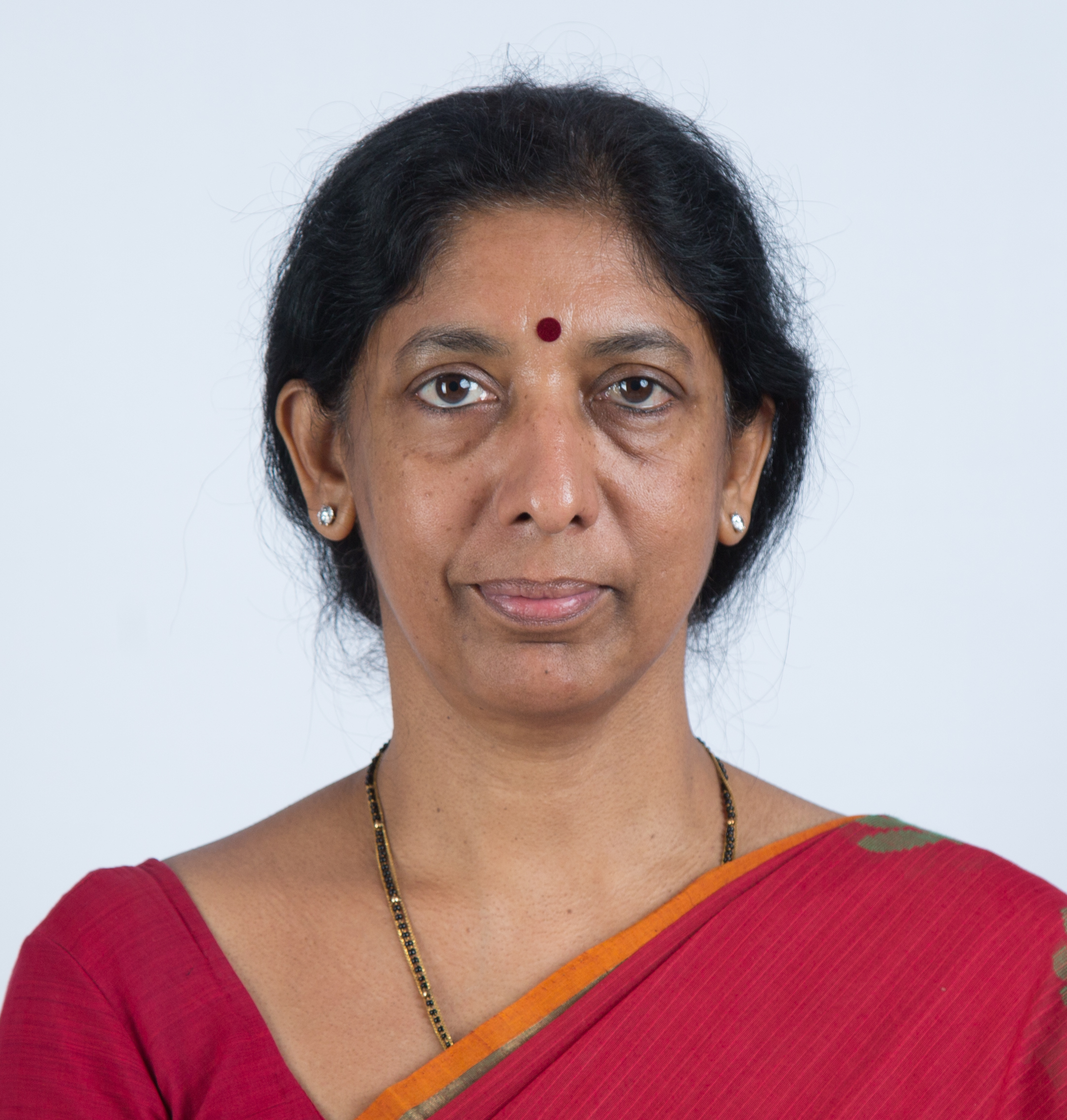
- Education: St Francis College for Women (BSc) University of Hyderabad (MSc) Centre for Cellular and Molecular Biology (PhD)
- Known for: Discovery of a key hydrolytic enzyme involved in bacterial cell wall growth
- Awards: Infosys Prize in Life Sciences (2019)
- Scientific career
- Fields: Microbiology, Bacterial Genetics
- Doctoral advisor: Jayaraman Gowrishankar

Manjula Reddy (born 1965) is an Indian bacterial geneticist. She is the chief scientist at the Centre for Cellular and Molecular Biology in Hyderabad, India. In 2019, she won the Infosys Prize in Life Sciences for her work on bacterial cell wall structure and synthesis. She is a Fellow of the Telangana Academy of Sciences and the Indian Academy of Sciences.

== Education and career ==
Manjula Reddy earned her PhD from the Centre for Cellular and Molecular Biology in 2002. She started her own lab at the institution in 2007.

== Research ==
Manjula Reddy conducts research on bacterial cell walls.

She identified a novel "spacemaker" enzyme encoded by the open reading frame called MepK in Escherichia coli. She found that this enzyme hydrolyses certain cross-links in peptidoglycan thereby allowing the bacterial cell wall to expand. She aims to develop novel antimicrobials that can target the peptidoglycan synthesis pathway. She uses the model organisms Mycobacterium smegmatis and Escherichia coli.

She was part of the team of scientists who patented the process for identifying mutagens and anti-mutagens. This process was patented from 1999 to 2018 in the United States. The other scientists in the team were Jayaraman Gowrishankar and Shanti M. Bharatan.

== Awards and honors ==
- Infosys Prize in Life Sciences (2019)
- Asian Scientist 100, Asian Scientist (2020)
- Fellow of the Indian Academy of Sciences (2020)
- Fellow of the Telangana Academy of Sciences
- Editorial board member of the Journal of Bacteriology

== Personal life ==
She has stated in an interview that her father, Mohan Reddy, and her mother were supportive of her career as a scientist. She is married to a cardiologist and has two sons.

== Selected publications ==
External videos
- https://www.youtube.com/watch?v=FlaqsjhsWuo Dr.Manjula Reddy presents her research at the first edition of the Infosys Prize 2019 Winners’ Symposium

- Chodisetti, Pavan Kumar, and Manjula Reddy. "Peptidoglycan hydrolase of an unusual cross-link cleavage specificity contributes to bacterial cell wall synthesis." Proceedings of the National Academy of Sciences 116.16 (2019): 7825-7830.
- Singh, Santosh Kumar, et al. "Regulated proteolysis of a cross-link–specific peptidoglycan hydrolase contributes to bacterial morphogenesis." Proceedings of the National Academy of Sciences 112.35 (2015): 10956-10961.
- Reddy, Manjula. "Role of FtsEX in cell division of Escherichia coli: viability of ftsEX mutants is dependent on functional SufI or high osmotic strength." Journal of bacteriology 189.1 (2007): 98-108.
