= Parnaik =

Parnaik is an Indian surname. Notable people with the surname include:

- Kaiwalya Trivikram Parnaik (born 1953), Indian politician and military officer
- Veena Parnaik (born 1953), Indian cell biologist
