= Rakesh Mishra =

Indian biologist

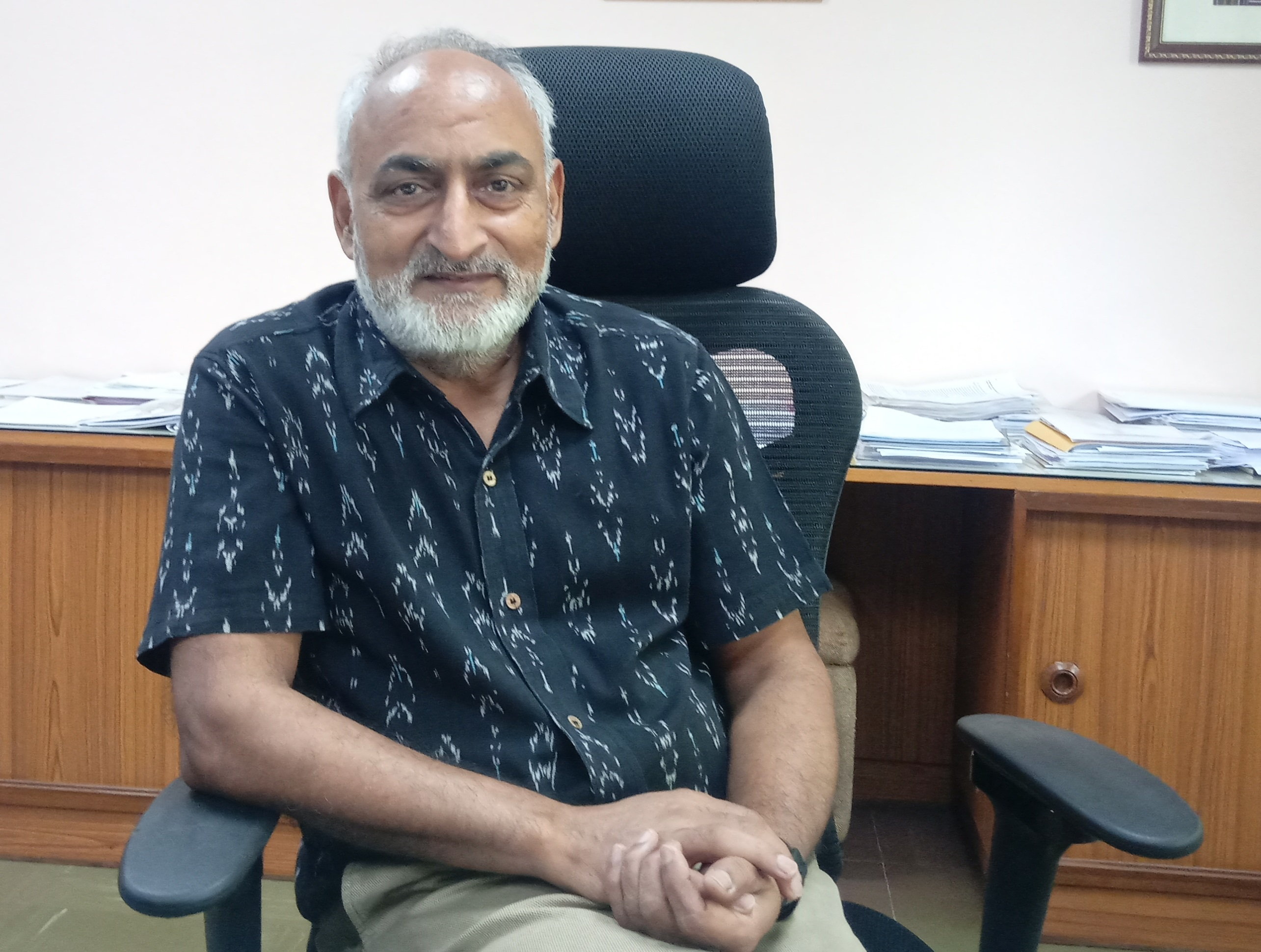
- Indian Geneticist; Former Director, CSIR-CCMB; Director, TIGS, Bengaluru
- Born: 14 April 1961 (age 65)
- Education: University of Allahabad
- Scientific career
- Fields: Genome Organisation, Chromatin Structure
- Workplaces: Centre for Cellular and Molecular Biology, Hyderabad
- Website: Homepage

Rakesh Kumar Mishra is an Indian scientist specializing in genomics and epigenetics. He is currently the Director of Tata Institute for Genetics and Society (TIGS), Bengaluru. Dr. Mishra retired as the 6th director of CSIR-Centre for Cellular and Molecular Biology (CCMB) in Hyderabad, India, on 30 April 2021 and holds J. C. Bose Fellowship at CCMB.

== Biography ==
He is an elected fellow of the Indian National Academy of Science, New Delhi, the Indian Academy of Sciences, the National Academy of Sciences and the Andhra Pradesh Academy of Sciences.

He is also a life member of Proteomics Society, India. Mishra obtained his master's degree in chemistry and Ph.D. in Organic Chemistry from the University of Allahabad and was appointed Director CCMB by CSIR, assuming charge on 19 May 2016. Mishra has also edited and contributed a chapter to the book, Chromosomes to Genome.

Mishra had previously held post doctoral positions at the Molecular Biophysics Unit, Indian Institute of Science, Bangalore, University of Bordeaux, France and University of Geneva, Switzerland prior to joining CSIR-CCMB in 2001.

== Research interests ==
Mishra investigates genome organisation focusing on evolutionarily conserved regions, structure of chromatin material and epigenetic regulation of genes during embryonic development stages.

== As a director of CCMB ==
Mishra assumed charge of CCMB on 19 May 2016. Some of the hallmark initiatives that he started in CCMB include:

- CCMB's efforts in developing lab-grown meat
- CCMB's fight against COVID-19
