= Habsiguda =

Habsiguda హబ్సిగూడ
- Neighbourhood
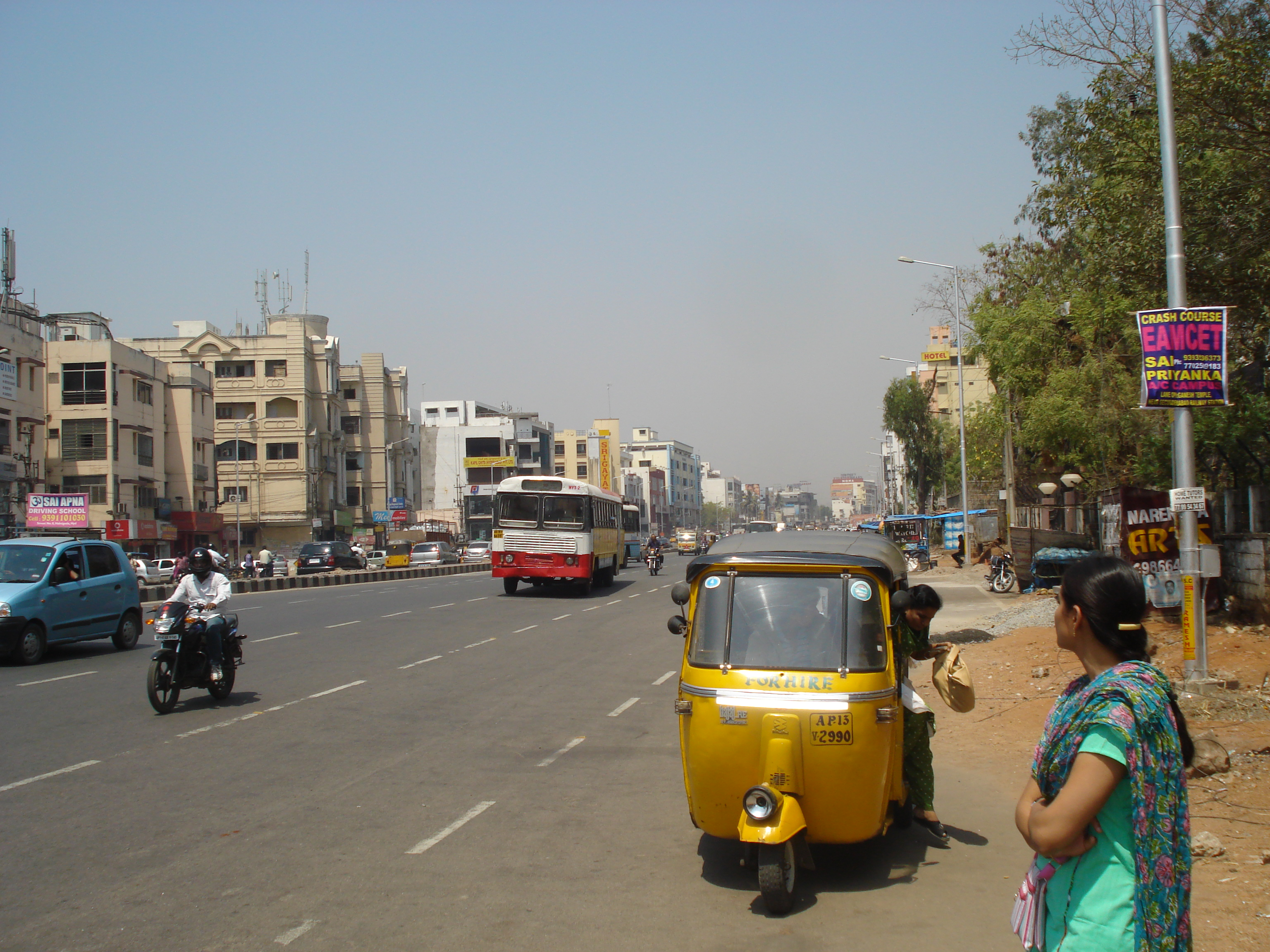
- Habsiguda main road in 2012

- Location in Hyderabad, India
- Coordinates: 17°25′09″N 78°32′29″E
- Country: India
- State: Telangana
- District: Hyderabad
- Zone: East
- Circle: Uppal Kalan
- Ward: 6

Government
  - Body: GHMC

Population (2012)
  - Total: 36,206

Languages
  - Official: Telugu
- Time zone: UTC+5:30 (IST)
- PIN: 500007
- Telephone code: +9140
- Vehicle registration: TG
- Lok Sabha constituency: Malkajgiri
- Vidhan Sabha constituency: Uppal
- Civic agency: Malkajgiri Municipal Corporarion
- Website: medchal-malkajgiri.telangana.gov.in

Habsiguda is a neighbourhood in Hyderabad, Telangana, India. It is located at the eastern end of the city between Tarnaka and Uppal. It forms Ward No. 7 of Greater Hyderabad Municipal Corporation.

== History of Habsiguda ==
The origin of the name Habsiguda may have originated from Habshi meaning African and guda a suffix for village; Habshi was a common term referring to the Siddi, Africans from Al-Habash (an Arabic term for Abbysinia or Ethiopia). This barren land was a Cattle ground for Nizams of Deccan Princely State, and was probably the home of the African troops in Nizam's military. Abyssinians used to be brought as labourers by Nizams to take care of their cattle. Habshi's (people from Abyssinia) lived for decades in and around this area hence the name "Habshi-guda" and now being called as Habsiguda. Today one can still find these Abyssinians in many parts of Old City and especially in "Barkas". Many of these people were mixed with local people and accepted in all communities.

Later Habsiguda was occupied by many construction and plantation labourers that were brought from surrounding districts to construct Osmania University by Mir Osman Ali Khan, Asaf Jah Vii (Last Nizam of Hyderabad Deccan).

Habsiguda remained as a hamlet under "Nacharam Village" until 1981 and later became an independent Grampanchayat under Uppal Kalan Municipality and now its part of Hyderabad Metropolitan City.

== Research institutes ==
- Center for Cellular and Molecular Biology
- Indian Institute of Chemical Technology
- National Geophysical Research Institute
- Central Food Technology Research Institute – Resource Center
- Indian Statistical Institute

== Transport ==
The Hyderabad Metro Rail has a route covering from Nagole to Raidurg which is laid via Habsiguda. Hyderabad Metro Rail Project is the World's Largest Public-Private Partnership Project (PPP) in the Metro Sector. The Hyderabad Metro Rail Network covers a total distance of around 72 km. It has three Metro stops one at Cricket Stadium, second at National Geophysical Research Institute and other at Crossroads of Habsiguda.

Habsiguda is well connected by TSRTC buses. It is about 5 km from Secunderabad Railway Station and about 11 km from Hyderabad Nampally Railway Station of the South Central Railway. Rajiv Gandhi International Airport, Hyderabad is about 30 km away from Habsiguda. The closest MMTS Train station is 2.5 km away at Sitaphalmandi.
