= Jayaraman Gowrishankar =

Indian medical microbiologist

- Born: 1956 (age 69–70); Chennai, India
- Education: University of Madras, University of Melbourne
- Awards: Padma Shri (2013)
- Scientific career
- Fields: Biology
- Workplaces: Centre for Cellular and Molecular Biology Centre for DNA Fingerprinting and Diagnostics Indian Institute of Science Education and Research, Mohali

Jayaraman Gowrishankar (born 1956) is an Indian medical microbiologist. Gowrishankar received his M.B.B.S. degree from the Christian Medical College, Vellore. He holds Doctor of philosophy in bacterial genetics from the University of Melbourne.

He was a Scientist and Group Leader at the Centre for Cellular and Molecular Biology in Hyderabad. In 2000, he was positioned as director for Centre for DNA Fingerprinting and Diagnostics. He served as director of the Indian Institute of Science Education and Research, Mohali from 11 December 2019 till 2 March 2024.

He was awarded in 1991, the Shanti Swarup Bhatnagar Prize for Science and Technology, the highest science award in India, in the Biological sciences category. He was awarded in 2013, the Padma Shri, India's fourth highest civilian honour, for his contribution towards the field of science.

== Civilian honours ==
- Padma Shri in 2013 by the Government of India.

== Research awards ==
- INSA Medal for Young Scientists, 1986
- CSIR Young Scientist Award, 1987
- BM Birla Prize. 1991
- Shanti Swarup Bhatnagar Prize for Science and Technology for 1991
- JC Bose Fellowship, 2007
- The 2012 Moselio Schaechter Distinguished Service Award - American Society for Microbiology

== Research highlights ==
- Discovery of the operon and its exquisite osmotic regulation
- Enunciation of a new hypothesis that toxic RNA-DNA hybrids (R-loops) are prone to occur from nascent untranslated transcripts in E coli.
