= Veena Parnaik =

Indian cell biologist (born 1953)

Dr. Veena Parnaik
- Born: 1953 (age 72–73); India
- Education: University of Mumbai; Ohio State University
- Known for: Contributions to the understanding of the nuclear lamina
- Awards: JC Bose Fellowship (2011)
- Scientific career
- Fields: Cell Biology
- Workplaces: Centre for Cellular and Molecular Biology; Centre for DNA Fingerprinting and Diagnostics

Veena Krishnaji Parnaik (born 1953) is an Indian cell biologist and the current Chief Scientist at the Centre for Cellular and Molecular Biology. She obtained her Masters in Science in medicinal biochemistry from the University of Mumbai and received her PhD from Ohio State University before moving back to India to work at the CCMB. Her research is focused on understanding the functional role of the nuclear lamina and how defects in it may lead to disorders such as progeria and muscular dystrophy.

== Education and career ==
In 1974, Dr. Veena Parnaik obtained her M.Sc from the University of Mumbai. She then traveled to the United States to obtain her PhD at Ohio State University for her research on the enzyme dextransucrase. She received her PhD in 1979 and then in 1980 she traveled back to India to work at the Centre for Cellular and Molecular Biology, (CCMB), in Hyderabad as a research associate. In 1981 she was promoted to scientist and she currently holds the role of Chief Scientist at the institution. Since that time she has been an active member of the Indian Society of Cell Biology and has been a member of the RAP-SAC of National Institute of Immunology in New Delhi and the Centre for DNA Fingerprinting and Diagnostics in Hyderabad.

== Research ==
Dr. Parnaik's research is mainly concerned with understanding the functional role of the nuclear lamina, not to be confused with the basal lamina which provides structural support to the extracellular matrix. The nuclear lamina provides structural support to the nucleus and is invaluable in its role in cell differentiation in the embryonic stage and its role in regulating certain cellular events such as cell division and DNA replication. Although her research is concerned with the functional role of the nuclear lamina the applications of her research may provide insight into the causes and genetic origins of laminopathies.

=== Laminopathies ===
Laminopathies are a group of rare genetic disorders that are caused by defects in genes that code for the nuclear lamina. Symptoms of laminopathy may include muscular dystrophy, diabetes, dysplasia and progeria (premature aging). Although there are a number of rare mutations that may result in laminopathy one of the most well researched causes is a mutation in the gene coding for lamin A/C (LMNA). Dr. Parnaik's research is concerned with discovering the cause of a number of defects on the nuclear level that result from mutations in LMNA that include failure to differentiate in adipose tissue, impaired nuclear integrity, impairment in the cell's ability to respond to DNA damaging agents, and cellular toxicity which may lead to premature aging.

=== Nuclear Lamins ===
A large role of Dr. Parnaik's research into the nuclear lamina is focused on the nuclear lamins, fibrous proteins found in the nuclear lamina that provide structural support and are essential for proper cell differentiation and gene regulation. Through her research, Dr. Parnaik has made considerable progress in understanding the role of nuclear lamins during embryonic development. She identified human lamin A/C as being invaluable to proper embryonic development by demonstrating that depletion leads to improper cell differentiation in stem cells. In cells where lamin A/C has been depleted the stem cells fail to differentiate into endoderm, mesoderm and ectoderm. In addition to stem cell differentiation, Dr. Parnaik's research has also shown a relationship between lamin A/C and cyclin D3. From her research, Dr. Parnaik pointed towards a complex that formed between lamin A/C and cyclin D3 that played an important role in muscle cell differentiation. Dr. Parnaik's research may pave the way to new understanding of how cell's differentiate in the embryonic stage and may provide insight into how mutations and deletions in these molecules may explain certain embryonic defects and failures to differentiate.

== Honors and awards ==
Dr. Parnaik has served on the Executive Committee of the Indian Society of Cell Biology for numerous years (1991-1994, 2003-2005, and 2007-2009) and she served as the president of the Society from 2011 to 2013. In 2004 she was elected Fellow of the Indian National Science Academy in New Delhi and in 2008 she was elected Fellow of the Indian Academy of Sciences in Bangalore. In 2011 she received the JC Bose Fellowship. Dr. Parnaik has also received a number of prestigious awards including the Shakuntala Devi Amirchand Prize of ICMR (1992), the Dr. PA Krup Lecture Award of Society of Biological Chemists for India (1997) and the Professor SP Ray-Chaudhuri Lecture Award of Indian Society of Cell Biology (2010).
