= Vinay K. Nandicoori =

- Born: 1 March 1969 (age 57); India
- Education: Indian Institute of Technology, Bombay; Indian Institute of Science; Texas A&M University; University of Virginia
- Known for: Studies on Mycobacterium tuberculosis
- Awards: 2009 N-BIOS Prize; 2009 NASI-Scopus Young Scientist Award
- Scientific career
- Fields: Immunology
- Workplaces: National Institute of Immunology, India

Vinay Kumar Nandicoori (born 1 March 1969) is an Indian immunologist, biotechnologist and currently the director of Centre for Cellular and Molecular Biology, India. He is known for his studies on the kinase-mediated signaling networks in Mycobacterium tuberculosis, the causative pathogen of tuberculosis. Holder of a master's degree in biotechnology from the Indian Institute of Technology, Bombay and a PhD from the Indian Institute of Science, Nandicoori did his post doctoral work the University of Virginia and Texas A & M University.

The Department of Biotechnology of the Government of India awarded him the National Bioscience Award for Career Development, one of the highest Indian science awards, for his contributions to biosciences, in 2010. He is also a member of Guha Research Conference, an elected fellow of the National Academy of Sciences, India and a recipient of the NASI-Scopus Young Scientist Award, which he received in 2009.

== Selected bibliography ==
- Lochab, S., Singh, Y., Sengupta, S. & Nandicoori, V. K. (2020) Mycobacterium tuberculosis exploits host ATM kinase for survival advantage through SecA2 secretome. eLife Mar 30;9. pii: e51466. doi: 10.7554/eLife.51466.
- Kaur, P., Rausch, M., Malakar, B., Watson, U., Damle, N. P., Chawla, Y., Srinivasan, S., Sharma, K., Schneider, T., Jhingan, G. D., Saini, D., Mohanty, D., Grein, F & Nandicoori, V. K. (2019) LipidII Interaction with specific residues of Mycobacterium tuberculosis PknB extracytoplasmic domain governs its optimal activation. Nature Communications 10, 1231 doi: 10.1038/s41467-019-09223-9.
- Soni, V., Upadhyay, S., Suryadevara, P., Samla, G., Singh, A., Yogeeswari, P., Sriram, D. & Nandicoori, V. K. (2015) Depletion of M. tuberculosis GlmU from infected murine lungs effects the clearance of the pathogen. Plos Pathogens 11, e1005235
- Jain, P., Malakar, B., Khan, M.Z., Lochab, S., Singh, A. & Nandicoori, V. K. (2018) Delineating FtsQ mediated regulation of cell division in Mycobacterium tuberculosis. J. Biol. Chem. 293(32):12331-12349.
- Arora, D., Chawla, Y., Malakar, B., Singh, A. & Nandicoori, V.K. (2018) The transpeptidase PbpA and non-canonical transglycosylase RodA of Mycobacterium tuberculosis play important roles in regulating bacterial cell lengths. J. Biol. Chem. 293, 6497-6516.
- Khan, M.Z., Bhaskar, A., Upadhyay, S., Kumari, P., Ramani, R.S., Jain, P., Singh, A., Kumar, D., Bhavesh, N.S. & Nandicoori, V. K. (2017) Protein kinase G confers survival advantage to Mycobacterium tuberculosis. J. Biol. Chem. 292, 16093-16108.
- Sharma, A. K., Arora, D., Singh, L.K., Gangwal, A., Sajid, A., Molle, V., Singh, Y. & Nandicoori, V. K. (2016) Serine/threonine protein phosphatase PstP of Mycobacterium tuberculosis is necessary for accurate cell division and survival of pathogen. J. Biol. Chem. 291, 24215-24230
- Nagarajan, S. N., Upadhyay, S., Chawla, Y., Khan, S., Naz, S., Subramanian, J., Gandotra, S. & Nandicoori, V. K. (2015) Protein kinase A (PknA) of Mycobacterium tuberculosis is independently activated and is critical for growth in vitro and survival of the pathogen in the host. J Biol Chem. 290, 9626-9645.
- Rajanala, K., Sarkar, A., Jhingan, G. D., Priyadarshini, R., Jalan, M., Sengupta, S. & Nandicoori, V. K. (2014) Phosphorylation of nucleoporin Tpr governs its differential localization and is required for its mitotic function. J Cell Science. 127, 3505-3520.
- Chawla, Y., Upadhyay, S., Khan, S., Nagarajan, S. N., Forti, F. & Nandicoori, V.K. (2014) Protein Kinase B (PknB) of Mycobacterium tuberculosis is essential for growth of the pathogen in vitro as well as for survival within the host. J Biol Chem. 289, 13858 – 13875.

== See also ==
- Serine/threonine-specific protein kinase
- Phosphorylation
