= Ramakrishnan Nagaraj =

Indian biochemist and molecular biologist (born 1953)

- Born: 10 February 1953 (age 73); Andhra Pradesh, India
- Education: University of Mumbai; Indian Institute of Technology, Mumbai; Indian Institute of Science
- Known for: Design of antibiotic peptides
- Awards: 1981 INSA Young Scientist Medal; 1988 IAS Young Associate Medal; 1988 CSIR Young Scientist Award; 1994 Shanti Swarup Bhatnagar Prize; 1995 SBCI P. B. Rama Rao Award
- Scientific career
- Fields: Biophysics; Biochemistry
- Workplaces: Centre for Cellular and Molecular Biology
- Doctoral advisor: Padmanabhan Balaram

Ramakrishnan Nagaraj (born 10 February 1953) is an Indian biochemist, molecular biologist and the leader of a team of scientists working in the field of peptide biochemistry at Centre for Cellular and Molecular Biology (CCMB). He is known for his studies on hemolytic and antibacterial properties in synthetic analogs of bacterial toxins. He is a J. C. Bose National fellow of the Department of Science and Technology at CCMB and an elected fellow of the Indian Academy of Sciences, National Academy of Sciences, India and the Indian National Science Academy. The Council of Scientific and Industrial Research, the apex agency of the Government of India for scientific research, awarded Nagaraj the Shanti Swarup Bhatnagar Prize for Science and Technology, one of the highest Indian science awards, in 1994, for his contributions to biological sciences.

== Biography ==
Born on 10 February 1953, Ramakrishnan Nagaraj graduated in science from the University of Mumbai and completed his master's degree at the Indian Institute of Technology, Mumbai before doing his doctoral research at the Indian Institute of Science under the guidance of Padmanabhan Balaram, a noted biochemist and Padma Bhushan laureate. Nagaraj joined the Centre for Cellular and Molecular Biology (CCMB) in 1980 as a scientist where he heads a team of scientists and pursues his researches on structure-function correlations in peptide antibiotics. He has done considerable work on signal peptides and peptide antibiotics and their structure-function relationships. Nagaraj is known to have suggested a protocol by which hemolytic and antibacterial properties of the synthetic analogs of bacterial toxins could be separated, an invention which is reported to be of assistance in designing antibiotic peptides. His researches have been documented in several articles; PubMed, an online repository of medical articles, has listed 273 of them.

== Awards and honors ==
The Indian National Science Academy awarded Nagaraj the Young Scientists Medal in 1981 and he held the Young Associateship of the Indian Academy of Sciences from 1985 to 1988. He received the Young Scientist Award of the Council of Scientific and Industrial Research (CSIR) in 1988; CSIR would honor him again in 1994 with the Shanti Swarup Bhatnagar Prize, one of the highest Indian science awards, in 1994. A Homi Bhabha Fellow of 1991, Nagaraj is also a recipient of the 1995 P. B. Rama Rao Award of the Society for Biological Chemists, India and an elected fellow of the Indian National Science Academy (1998), Indian Academy of Sciences (1992) and the National Academy of Sciences, India.

== Selected bibliography ==
- Sitaram, N.; Nagaraj, R. (1999). "Interaction of antimicrobial peptides with biological and model membranes: structural and charge requirements for activity". Biochim Biophys Acta. 1462 (2): 29–54. doi:10.1016/s0005-2736(99)00199-6. PMID 10590301.
- Mandal, M.; Jagannadham, M.V.; Nagaraj, R. (March 2002). "Antibacterial activities and conformations of bovine β-defensin BNBD-12 and analogs:structural and disulfide bridge requirements for activity". Peptides. 23 (3): 413–418. doi:10.1016/S0196-9781(01)00628-3. PMID 11835989. S2CID 1410192.
- Pallavi, B.; Nagaraj, R. (2003). "Palmitoylated peptides from the cysteine- rich domain of SNAP-23 cause membrane fusion depending on peptide length, position of cysteines, and extent of palmitoylation". Journal of Biological Chemistry. 278 (15): 12737–44. doi:10.1074/jbc.M208598200. PMID 12551899. S2CID 400106.
- Sowmya, Bekshe L.; Jagannadham, M. V.; Nagaraj, Ramakrishnan (2006). "Interaction of synthetic peptides corresponding to the scaffolding domain of Caveolin-3 with model membranes". Biopolymers. 84 (6): 615–624. doi:10.1002/bip.20595. PMID 16948121.
- Chaudhary, Nitin; Singh, Shashi; Nagaraj, Ramakrishnan (2008). "Organic solvent mediated self-association of an amyloid forming peptide from β2-microglobulin: An atomic force microscopy study". Biopolymers. 90 (6): 783–791. doi:10.1002/bip.21087. PMID 18798577. S2CID 34813740.

== See also ==
- Arthropod defensin
- Padmanabhan Balaram
