= Amitabha Chattopadhyay =

Indian molecular biologist

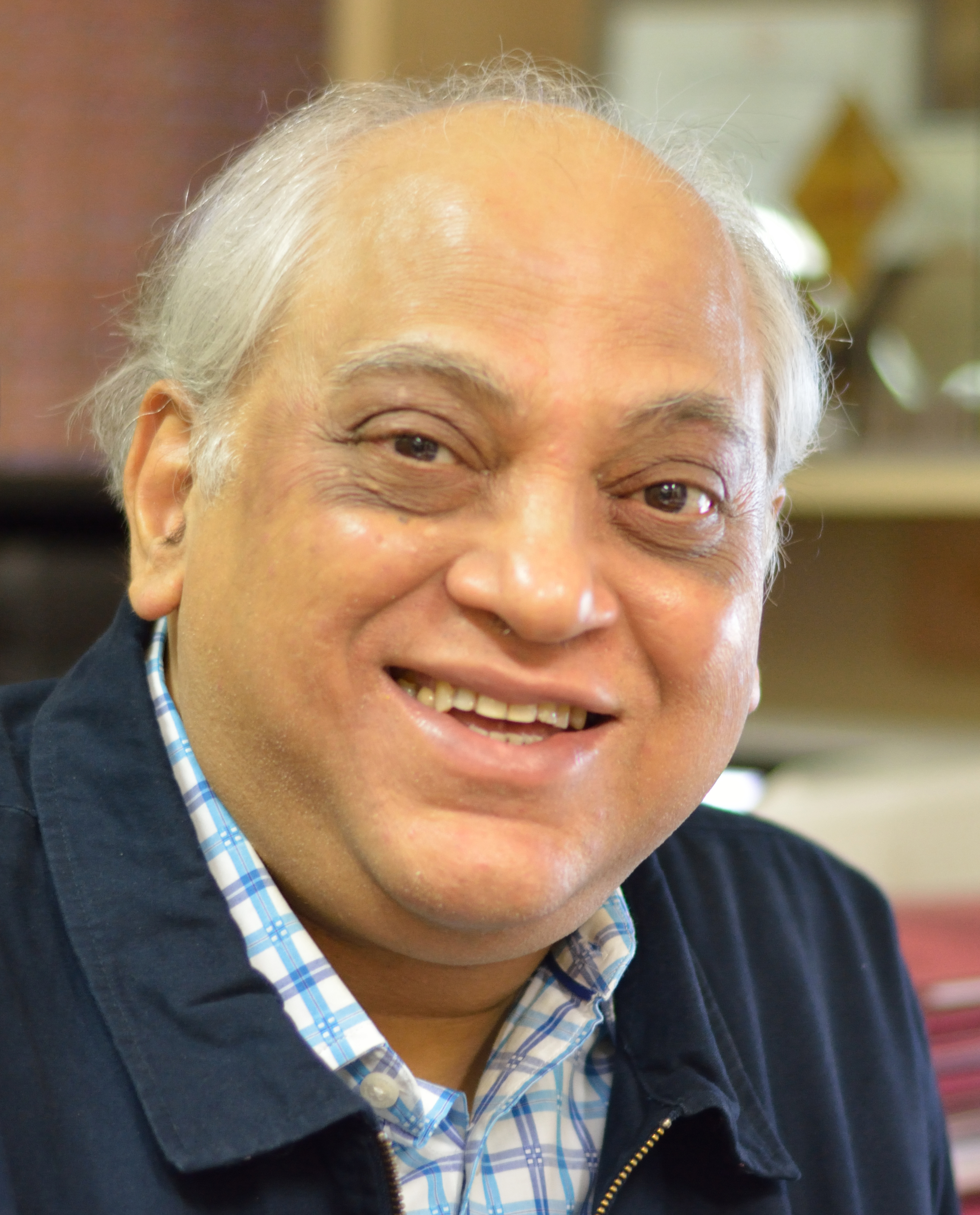
- Born: Kolkata, West Bengal, India
- Education: IIT Kanpur, SUNY, Stony Brook University of California, Davis
- Known for: Research on the organization, dynamics and function of biological membranes, and the role of membrane cholesterol in the function of GPCRs
- Awards: Shanti Swarup Bhatnagar Prize; Ranbaxy Research Award; Prof. G.N. Ramachandran Gold Medal; TWAS Prize
- Scientific career
- Fields: Membrane and GPCR biophysics and biology
- Workplaces: Center for Cellular and Molecular Biology
- Doctoral advisor: Erwin London, Mark McNamee
- Website: e-portal.ccmb.res.in/e-space/amit/Pages/Index.htm

Amitabha Chattopadhyay is an Indian scientist working in the areas of membrane and receptor biology and biophysics . He is presently a CSIR Bhatnagar Fellow at the Center for Cellular and Molecular Biology and served as the founding dean of biological sciences at the Academy of Scientific and Innovative Research (AcSIR). In addition, he is a distinguished visiting professor at the Indian Institute of Technology Bombay, adjunct professor at the Jawaharlal Nehru University (New Delhi), Tata Institute of Fundamental Research, Indian Institute of Science Education and Research (Kolkata), Swinburne University of Technology (Australia), and honorary professor at the Jawaharlal Nehru Centre for Advanced Scientific Research (Bangalore). He was elected a Fellow of the Royal Society of Chemistry in 2013 and Royal Society of Biology in 2017. Chattopadhyay has authored more than 300 research papers and has an h-index of 65.

In 2016, Chattopadhyay won The World Academy of Sciences in Biology for his seminal contribution in understanding the role of membrane cholesterol in the organization and function in healthy and diseased conditions.

== Education ==
Chattopadhyay's schooling was in Ballygunge Govt High School in kolkata. He passed Higher Secondary in the year 1973. Chattopadhyay received B.Sc. with honors in chemistry from St. Xavier's College (Kolkata), holds an M.Sc. from IIT Kanpur, a doctorate in philosophy from State University of New York (SUNY) at Stony Brook, and was a postdoctoral fellow at the University of California, Davis.

== Research ==
Chattopadhyay's work is focused on monitoring organization, dynamics and function of biological membranes in healthy and diseased conditions. His group has developed and applied novel, innovative and sensitive techniques based on fluorescence spectroscopy for monitoring solvent relaxation in membranes, membrane-mimetic media, and proteins. Chattopadhyay's group focuses on the role of membrane cholesterol in regulating the organization, dynamics and function of G protein-coupled receptors (GPCRs), Pioneering work from his group showed that membrane cholesterol is necessary for the function and organization of GPCRs. In addition, his work has provided novel insight in the role of membrane cholesterol in the entry of pathogens into host cells. He has used fluorescence-based microscopic approaches such as Fluorescence Recovery After Photobleaching (FRAP), Fluorescence Correlation Spectroscopy (FCS), and Fluorescence Resonance Energy Transfer (FRET) to provide useful insight into organization, dynamics and function of membrane receptors.

== Honors and awards ==
Chattopadhyay's contributions in membrane and receptor biology and biophysics have been recognized by several awards and prizes. These include The World Academy of Sciences (TWAS) Prize, Shanti Swarup Bhatnagar Award, Ranbaxy Research Award, Prof. G.N. Ramachandran Gold Medal, SERB Distinguished Fellowship, Prof. G.N. Ramachandran 60th Birthday Medal and J.C. Bose Fellowship. He is an elected Fellow of The World Academy of Sciences, Royal Society of Biology, Royal Society of Chemistry, and all the Indian Academies of Science.

- Fellow, The World Academy of Sciences (2017)
- Fellow, The Royal Society of Biology (2017)
- Fellow, The Royal Society of Chemistry (2013)
- Fellow, Indian National Science Academy (2005)
- Fellow, Indian Academy of Sciences (1999)
- Fellow, The National Academy of Sciences, India (1998)
- Fellow, West Bengal Academy of Science & Technology (2010)
- Fellow, Andhra Pradesh Akademi of Sciences (2003)
- Fellow, Telangana Academy of Sciences (2015)
