= Jyotsna Dhawan =

Indian Cell and Developmental Biologist

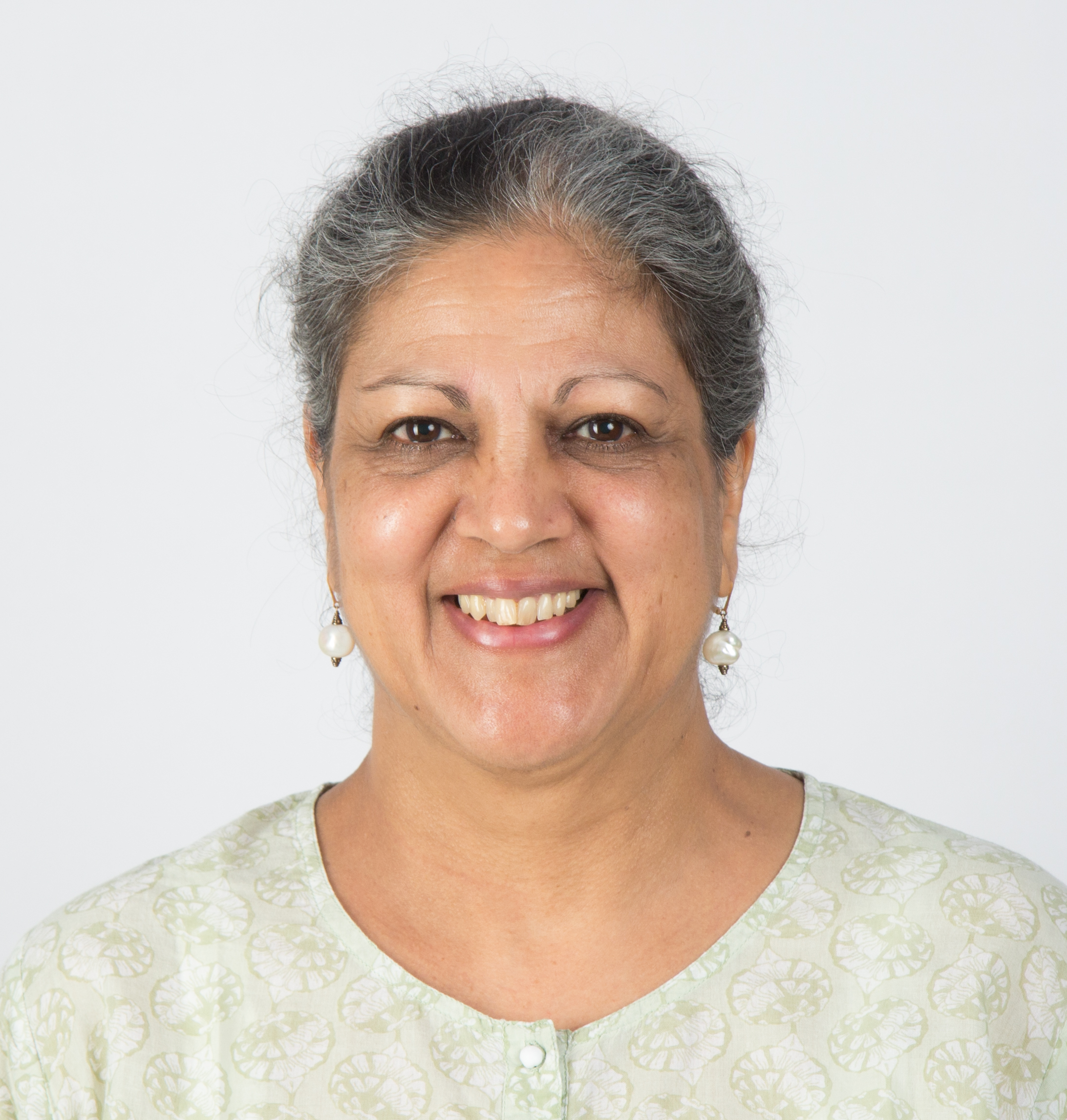
Jyotsna Dhawan

Jyotsna Dhawan is an Indian Cell and Developmental Biologist, Emeritus Scientist at Centre for Cellular and Molecular Biology and Visiting Professor, Institute for Stem Cell Science and Regenerative Medicine (inStem). Dhawan's research has focused on adult stem cell function and skeletal muscle regeneration. Dhawan is the current (2019-2021) President of the Indian Society for Cell Biology and the Indian Society of Developmental Biologists (2017–2020). Dhawan was elected as a fellow to the Indian National Science Academy in 2019.

== Early life and education ==
Dhawan's father Satish Dhawan was a faculty at the Indian Institute of Science and Dhawan's mother Nalini, was a cytogeneticist. She completed her master's in botany from Delhi University in 1983. She contemplated quitting her master's degree however, a summer internship in yeast genetics at the Tata Institute of Fundamental Research, convinced her to pursue a PhD. She completed her PhD from Boston University in 1991. She completed her postdoctoral training at Stanford University studying muscle stem cells and gene therapy in 1995.

== Career ==
Dhawan joined Centre for Cellular and Molecular Biology as faculty in 1996 and started her lab studying the biology of muscle stem cells and muscle repair. From 2009–2014, she helped set up the Institute for Stem Cell Science and Regenerative Medicine (inStem) in Bangalore and served as Senior Professor and Dean. In 2014, she returned to Centre for Cellular and Molecular Biology and retained ties to InStem as a visiting professor and member of the advisory board.

Dhawan has been an active advocate for establishing India as a leader in biomedical research. She serves as the Scientist In Charge of Centre for Cellular and Molecular Biology’s iHub, an innovation space with an incubation center for biomedical startups and has served on several scientific review committees, scientific task forces and advisory boards at the national and institutional level. She has also been a part on the editorial board of Physiological Genomics, BBRC and Frontiers in Cell and Developmental Biology.

== Selected publications ==
- Cheedipudi, Sirisha; Puri, Deepika; Saleh, Amena; Gala, Hardik P.; Rumman, Mohammed; Pillai, Malini S.; Sreenivas, Prethish; Arora, Reety; Sellathurai, Jeeva; Schrøder, Henrik Daa; Mishra, Rakesh K.; Dhawan, Jyotsna (27 July 2015). "A fine balance: epigenetic control of cellular quiescence by the tumor suppressor PRDM2/RIZ at a bivalent domain in the cyclin a gene". Nucleic Acids Research. 43 (13): 6236–6256. doi:10.1093/nar/gkv567. PMC 4513853. PMID 26040698.
- Krishna, Srikar; Nair, Aparna; Cheedipudi, Sirisha; Poduval, Deepak; Dhawan, Jyotsna; Palakodeti, Dasaradhi; Ghanekar, Yashoda (1 January 2013). "Deep sequencing reveals unique small RNA repertoire that is regulated during head regeneration in Hydra magnipapillata". Nucleic Acids Research. 41 (1): 599–616. doi:10.1093/nar/gks1020. PMC 3592418. PMID 23166307.
- Sebastian, S.; Sreenivas, P.; Sambasivan, R.; Cheedipudi, S.; Kandalla, P.; Pavlath, G. K.; Dhawan, J. (24 March 2009). "MLL5, a trithorax homolog, indirectly regulates H3K4 methylation, represses cyclin A2 expression, and promotes myogenic differentiation". Proceedings of the National Academy of Sciences. 106 (12): 4719–4724. Bibcode:2009PNAS..106.4719S. doi:10.1073/pnas.0807136106. PMC 2651835. PMID 19264965.
