= Ghanshyam Swarup =

Indian molecular biologist (born 1953)

- Born: 23 November 1953 (age 72); Uttar Pradesh, India
- Education: Kanpur University; Tata Institute of Fundamental Research; Vanderbilt University School of Medicine
- Known for: Discovery of a nuclear protein tyrosine phosphatase Studies on Glaucoma
- Awards: 1989 CSIR Young Scientist Award; 1996 Shanti Swarup Bhatnagar Prize
- Scientific career
- Fields: Molecular biology
- Workplaces: Centre for Cellular and Molecular Biology

Ghanshyam Swarup (born 1953) is an Indian molecular biologist, a J. C. Bose National Fellow and the head of the Ghanshyam Swarup Research Group of the Centre for Cellular and Molecular Biology. He is known for his studies on glaucoma and the discovery of protein tyrosine phosphatase, a new protein influencing the regulation of cell proliferation. Swarup is an elected fellow of the Indian Academy of Sciences, the Indian National Science Academy and the National Academy of Sciences, India. The Council of Scientific and Industrial Research, the apex agency of the Government of India for scientific research, awarded him the Shanti Swarup Bhatnagar Prize for Science and Technology, one of the highest Indian science awards, in 1996, for his contributions to biological sciences.

== Biography ==
Ghanshyam Swarup, born on 23 November 1953 in the Indian state of Uttar Pradesh, graduated in science from Chhatrapati Shahu Ji Maharaj University and continued his studies there to secure a master's degree before moving to Mumbai to complete his PhD at Tata Institute of Fundamental Research (TIFR). His post-doctoral studies were at David L. Garbers' laboratory of Vanderbilt University School of Medicine where he had the opportunity to work alongside Stanley Cohen, the 1986 Nobel laureate. Returning to India, Swarup joined the Centre for Cellular and Molecular Biology as a scientist and is the head of Ghanshyam Swarup Group which carries out researches on optineurin and the functional defects caused in humans by its mutations.

== Legacy ==
Swarup, while working with Stanley Cohen in the US on cellular signaling mechanisms, is reported to have discovered a new nuclear protein tyrosine phosphatase (PTPase) and his subsequent work demonstrated that the protein plays a part in the regulation of cell proliferation. Later, during his early days at CCMB, he elucidated the molecular cloning of a protein tyrosine phosphatase and its bind with DNA and established the methodology for alternative splicing of a gene to form four different variations of PTPase. Swarup's studies are known to have assisted in identifying the first cargo (PTP-S4/TC48) for the putative cargo receptors in mammalian cells. He has established a laboratory, Ghanshyam Swarup Group, where his team focuses on researches on protein optineurin and how disease-associated mutation affect humans. Associated with L. V. Prasad Eye Institute, he works on one of the mutated genes of optineurin as a causative factor of glaucoma, an eye disease leading to irrecoverable loss of vision and has elaborated on the pathogenesis in the disease from a molecular perspective.

Swarup has published several articles detailing his research findings; (Note: Please see Selected bibliography section) ResearchGate, an online repository of scientific articles has listed 81 of them. He is a member of the editorial board of the Journal of Molecular Signaling and is known to be active in the researches done by others. Swarup has mentored several scholars in their doctoral and post-doctoral researches at his research group in CCMB as well as scholars from other institutions.

== Awards and honors ==
Swarup, who was elected as a fellow by the National Academy of Sciences, India in 1988, received the Young Scientist Award of the Council of Scientific and Industrial Research in 1989. The Indian Academy of Sciences made him their elected fellow in 1995 and the CSIR honored him again in 1996 with the Shanti Swarup Bhatnagar Prize, one of the highest Indian science awards. An elected member of the Guha Research Conference, Swarup became an elected fellow of the Indian National Science Academy in 2003. In 2011, he was selected for the J. C. Bose National Fellowship of the Department of Science and Technology on which he pursues his current researches at CCMB.

== Selected bibliography ==
- Ghanshyam Swarup (January 2014). "Molecular Basis of Pathogenesis in Glaucoma Caused by Mutations in Optineurin". CSIR News. 64 (1).
- Madhavi Latha Somaraju Chalasani, Asha Kumari, Vegesna Radha, Ghanshyam Swarup (April 2014). "E50K-OPTN-induced retinal cell death involves the Rab GTPase-activating protein, TBC1D17 mediated block in autophagy". PLOS ONE. 9 (4) e95758. Bibcode:2014PLoSO...995758C. doi:10.1371/journal.pone.0095758. PMC 3994150. PMID 24752605.
- Kapil Sirohi, Ghanshyam Swarup (August 2015). "Defects in autophagy caused by glaucoma-associated mutations in optineurin". Experimental Eye Research. 144: 54–63. doi:10.1016/j.exer.2015.08.020. PMID 26302410.
- Kapil Sirohi, Asha Kumari, Vegesna Radha, Ghanshyam Swarup (October 2015). "A Glaucoma-Associated Variant of Optineurin, M98K, Activates Tbk1 to Enhance Autophagosome Formation and Retinal Cell Death Dependent on Ser177 Phosphorylation of Optineurin". PLOS ONE. 10 (9) e0138289. Bibcode:2015PLoSO..1038289S. doi:10.1371/journal.pone.0138289. PMC 4574030. PMID 26376340.

== See also ==
- Protein tyrosine phosphatase
- Optineurin
- Glaucoma
- Stanley Cohen (biochemist)
