= Dorairajan Balasubramanian =

Indian biophysical chemist and ocular biochemist

- Born: 28 August 1939 (age 87); Tamil Nadu, India
- Education: BITS, Pilani
- Occupation: Biophysical chemist
- Years active: since 1965
- Known for: Ocular biochemistry
- Spouse: Shakti
- Children: 2
- Awards: Padma Shri National Order of Merit (France); Shanti Swarup Bhatnagar Prize; Third World Academy of Science Award; Khwarizmi Award; UNESCO Kalinga Prize; INSA Indira Gandhi Prize; DST National Prize; Goyal Prize; INSA J. C. Bose Medal; Om Prakash Bhasin Award; IACS Dr. Mahendra Lal Sircar Prize; Fukui Award; Ranbaxy Research Award; SBCI Sarma Memorial Award; FICCI Award; ICMR M. O. T. Iyengar Award; Rev. Fr. L. M. Yeddanapalli Memorial Award
- Website: Profile on Academy of Sciences Leopoldina

Dorairajan Balasubramanian, popularly known as Professor Balu, is an Indian biophysical chemist and ocular biochemist. He is a former President of Indian Academy of Sciences and a director of research at the Prof. Brien Holden Eye Research Centre of L. V. Prasad Eye Institute, Hyderabad. A recipient of the National Order of Merit (France), Balasubramanian was honored by the Government of India, in 2002, with the fourth highest Indian civilian award of Padma Shri.

== Biography ==
Dorairajan Balasubramanian was born on 28 August 1939 in the South Indian state of Tamil Nadu. He graduated in Chemistry (BSc) from Madras University in 1957 and secured his master's degree (MSc) in Chemistry with first rank in 1959 from BITS, Pilani. He moved to the United States in 1960 for researching for his doctoral studies and completed it in 1965 to obtain PhD in biophysical chemistry from Columbia University. He continued in the United States for his post doctoral research as a Jane Coffin Childs Fund Fellow at the University of Minnesota Medical School till 1966.

Balasubramanian returned to India in 1966 and joined the Indian Institute of Technology, Kanpur as a lecturer where he rose in ranks over the years to become an assistant professor and a professor. In 1977, he was appointed as the professor and dean of the School of Chemistry at the University of Hyderabad where he worked till 1982 when he took up the post of the deputy director of the Centre for Cellular and Molecular Biology. He retired from the institution as its director in 1998 and moved to L. V. Prasad Eye Institute where he is the director of research of Prof. Brien Holden Eye Research Centre. He also serves as the visiting professor at the University of New South Wales, Sydney and as the adjunct professor of Birla Institute of Technology and Science, Pilani, India.

Balasubramanian is married to Shakti who is associated with ETV as a producer and the couple has two daughters. The elder daughter, Katyayani is a research analyst and the younger one, Akhila works as a public health professional. The family lives in Hyderabad.

== Positions ==
Balasubramanian is a visiting scientist at the National Eye Institute, Bethesda and is a senior Fellow of ophthalmology at the University of Melbourne. He is the chairman of the Task Force on Stem Cell Research set up by the Department of Biotechnology of the Government of India. He is a former president of the Indian Academy of Sciences (2007-2010) and is the incumbent the chairman of the Biotechnology Advisory Council of the Government of Andhra Pradesh. A former secretary general of The World Academy of Sciences, he has served as the project coordinator of Translational Centre in Eye Diseases of Champalimaud Foundation (C-TRACER) and the Affordable Healthcare Project of the Wellcome Trust for finding solutions for the use of scaffolds for cultivating stem cells. He is a former member of the International Human Rights Network of Academies and Scholarly Societies, the International Basic Sciences Panel of UNESCO and the International Chapter Affiliate Committee of the Association for Research in Vision and Ophthalmology (ARVO), United States. He has also served as an editorial board member of several international journals. He had also been appointed as one of the honorary advisory committee members for the International Conference on Genome Biology 2019 (ICGB'19) by the School of Biological Sciences of Madurai Kamaraj University.

== Legacy ==
Cataract in human eye

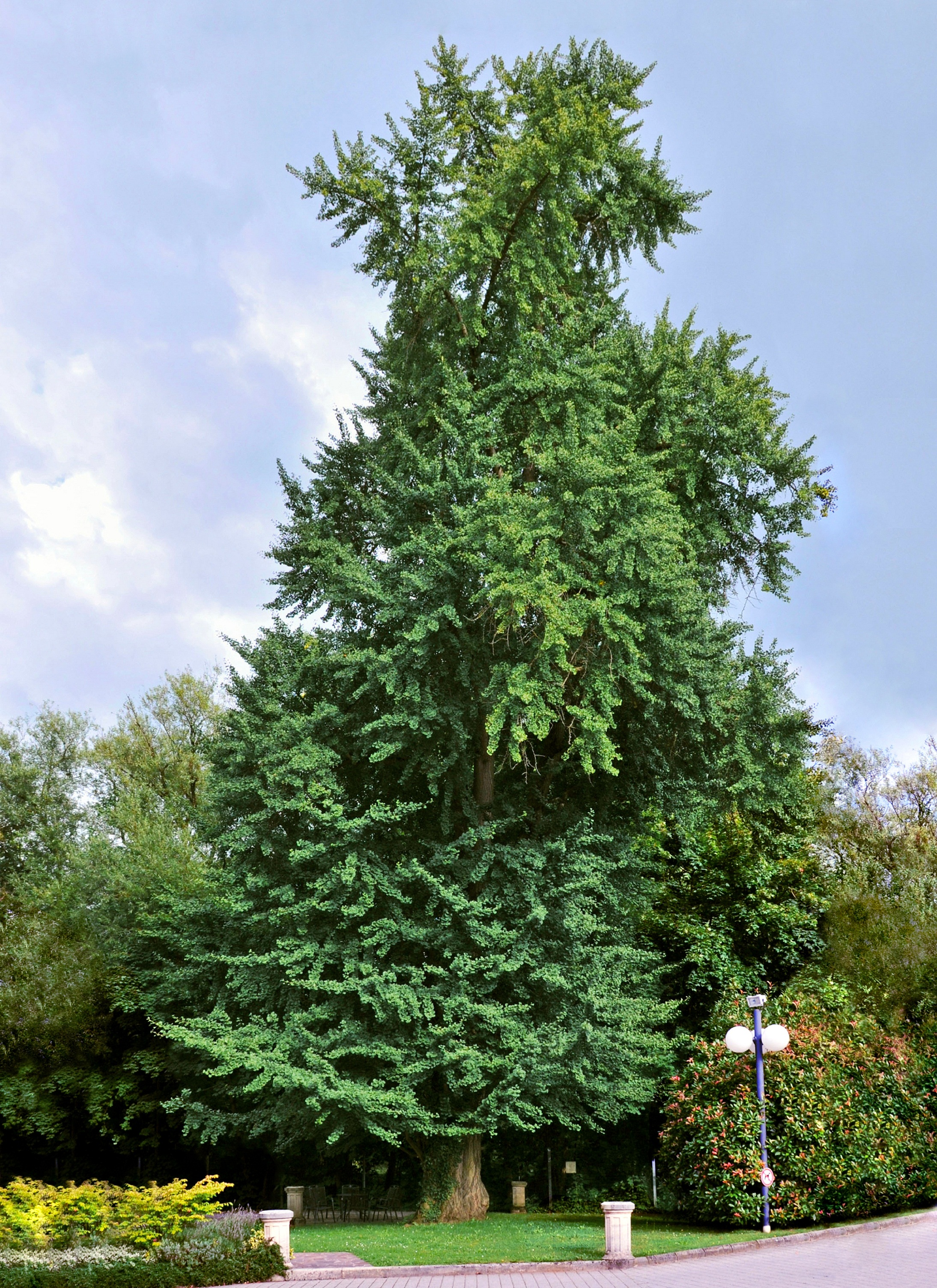
Ginko tree

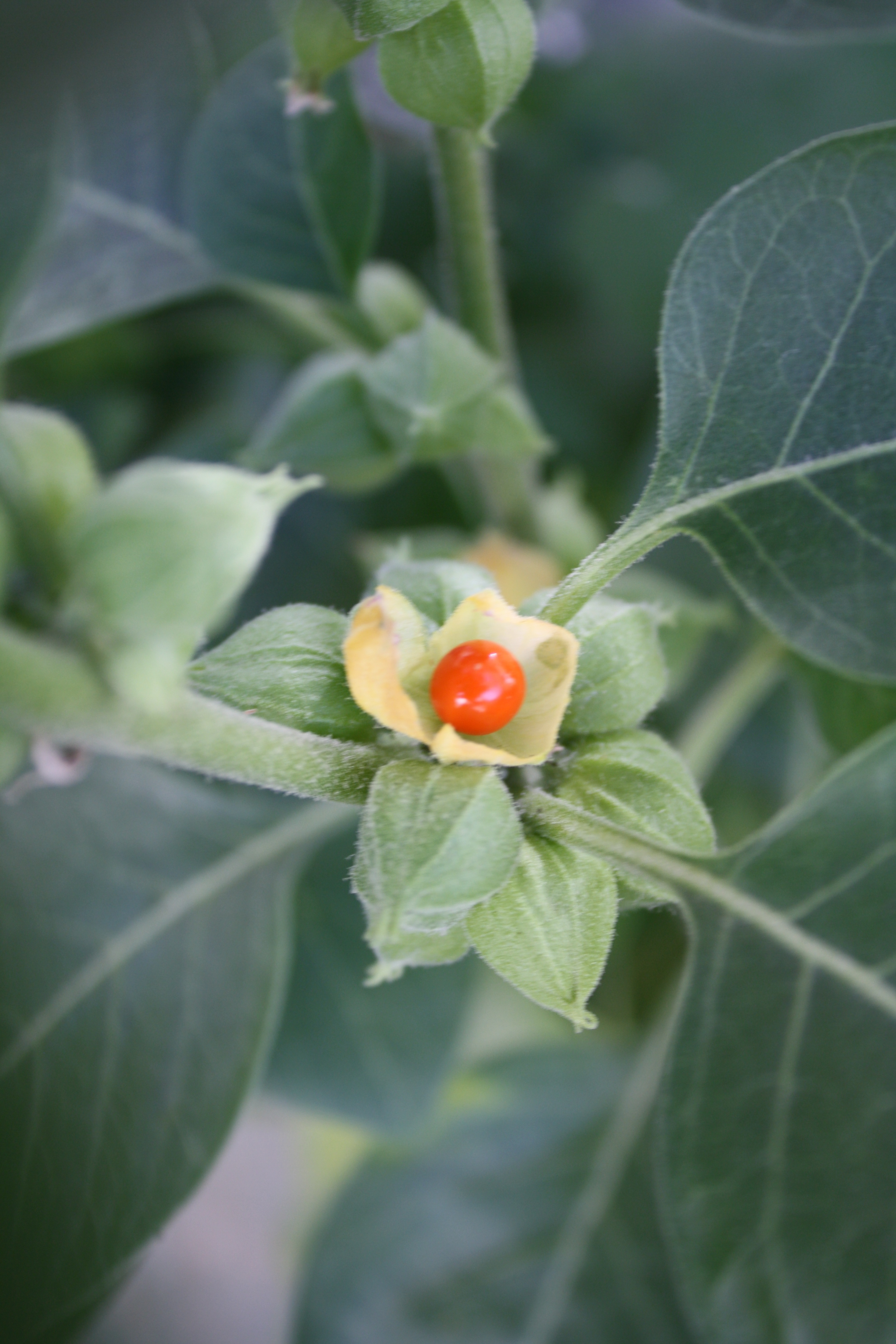
Withania

Balasubramanian started his research activities in 1965 focusing on the structure and functions of proteins and polypeptides and worked on the thermodynamic analysis of their stability. The focus of his research changed in 1984/85 when he started to work on ocular science and concentrated on crystallins of eye lens and their function as an agent in keeping the lens transparent. His research revealed how cataract is caused when crystallins are damaged photochemically, thereby leading to diminished lenticular transparency. He argued that the oxidative stress on the lens induces covalent chemical changes in the constituent molecules and these changes lead to cataract. He researched further on the subject to find out that, by supplementing antioxidants and cytoprotective substances, the progression of cataract can be slowed down. These findings are known to have introduced a prophylactic approach to addressing the issue of cataract, which is reported to be the causal factor for 47.9 percent of the blindness in the world. Further, he attempted to identify the cataractostatic agents and proposed the benefits of tea polyphenols, Ginko Biloba and Withania somnifera extracts. These substances contained antioxidants and cytoprotective compounds which slow down the progression of oxidative cataract and this was verified during experiments in animals.

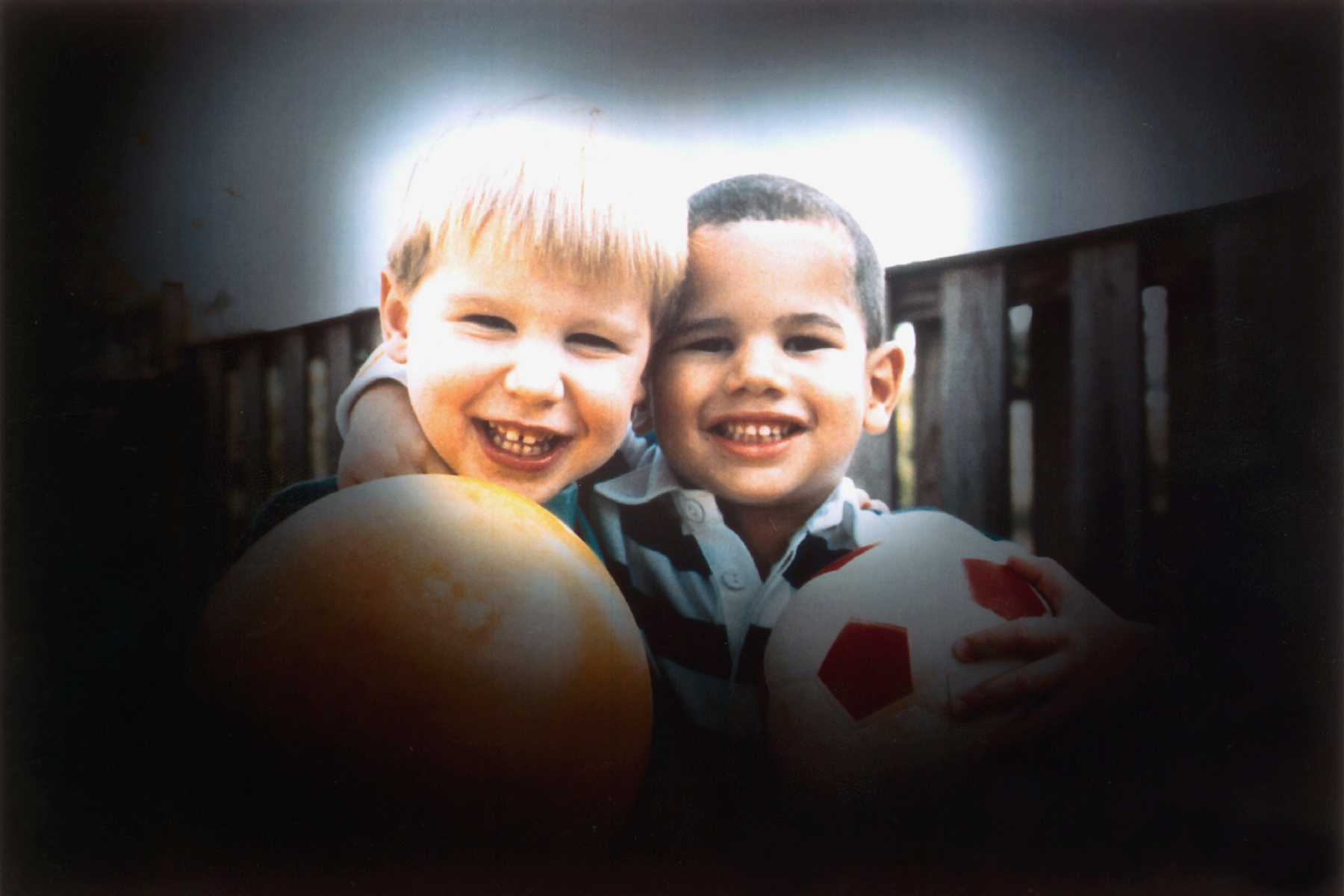
Advanced vision loss from Glaucoma.

After the turn of the century, Balasubramanian and his colleagues started working on inherited eye diseases and their molecular genetics. The group carried out research on diseases such as congenital glaucoma with a sampling set of over 400 families and this has helped in revealing 15 mutations in the gene CYP1B1, with mutation R368H being the most common one. The research has also recorded the genotype–phenotype correlations and the structural changes occur in mutated protein and these findings have assisted in clinical prediction of the disease and in early therapeutic intervention to avert blindness.

Balasubramanian is now working on stem cell biology and its use in restoring lost vision. He and his group have been successful in isolating the adult stem cells found in the limbus, around the cornea, and culturing them on human amniotic membrane. These cultured stem cells were, later, used to produce corneal epithelia that can be stitched on to human eye. Clinical tests on 200 patients who lost eyesight due to chemical or fire burns returned significantly good results with vision restoration to 20/20 levels, with or without subsequent corneal grafts or transplantation. These tests are reported to be the largest successful human trial of adult stem cell therapy in the world.

Balasubramanian has published 6 books of which two books, one on chemistry and the other in biotechnology, are prescribed text books for academic studies. He is credited with over 450 articles, published in peer reviewed national and international journals and Microsoft Academic Search, an online repository of scientific articles, has listed 52 of them. He has presented more than 170 scientific papers and has contributed in popularizing science by writing columns in leading newspapers such as The Hindu and The Times of India since 1980. On the academic front, he has assisted 16 doctoral students in their PhD studies. His efforts are also reported behind the establishment of a vaccine unit at the Centre for Cellular and Molecular Biology and in designing a quality improvement program for the Sericulture Laboratory of the state government.

== Awards and recognitions ==
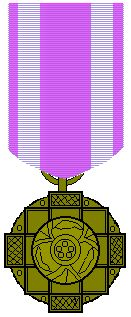
Padma Shri India IIIe Klasse

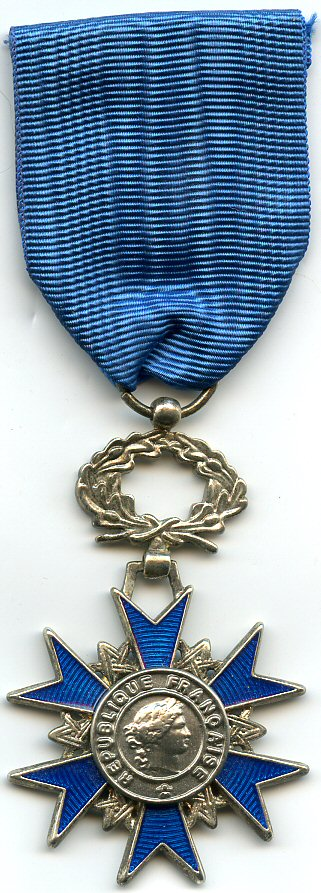
Chevalier de l'Ordre National du Mérite (France)

Dorairajan Balasubramanian, an honorary Professor of the Jawaharlal Nehru Centre for Advanced Scientific Research, is an elected member of Indian National Science Academy (INSA), Indian Academy of Sciences (IAS), National Academy of Sciences, India (NASI), Third World Academy of Sciences (TWAS) and the American Association for the Advancement of Science. He is also a Fellow of the Academy of Sciences Leopoldina, Germany, Mauritian Academy of Sciences and the International Molecular Biology Network.

He has delivered many award lectures in India and abroad. In 1985, he delivered the National Lecture of the University Grants Commission and the next year, the Prof. K. Venkataraman Endowment Lecture. K. S. G. Doss Memorial Lecture and the SERC National Lecture were delivered in 1991 followed by Pasteur Centenary Lecture, R. P. Mitra Memorial Lecture and the Platinum Jubilee Lecture of the Indian Science Congress Association in 1995. Some of the other award lectures given by Balasubramanian are:

- Madurai Kamaraj University Convocation Address
- Ranganathan Centre for Information Studies Annual Lecture
- J. C. Ray Memorial Oration Award
- C. V. Raman Lecture
- B. C. Guha Memorial Lecture
- Lily Pithavadian Endowment Lecture
- BHU Foundation Lecture
- TNAU-MFL Endowment Lecture
- Kumari L. A. Meera Memorial Lecture
- Prof. McBain Memorial Lecture
- Birbal Sahni Institute of Palaeobotany Foundation Day Lecture
- Jana Reddy Venkata Reddy Endowment Lecture
- Sri Venugopal Oration Medical Research Foundation Lecture
- Elite School of Optometry Convocation Address Foundation Day Lecture
- Dr. P. S. Murthy Memorial Lecture
- Dr. Ram Mohan Rao Oration
- Dr. K. Gopalakrishna Oration

Balasubramanian received his first award, the Rev. Fr. L. M. Yeddanapalli Memorial Award and Medal of the Indian Chemical Society in 1977. In 1981, he was awarded the Shanti Swarup Bhatnagar Prize in chemical science by the Council for Scientific and Industrial Research. The year 1983 brought him three awards, the SBCI Sarma Memorial Award, FICCI Award and the ICMR M. O. T. Iyengar Award. He received the Ranbaxy Award in 1990, the Fukui Award of the National Foundation for Eye Research, United States, in 1991 and Dr. Mahendra Lal Sircar Prize from the Indian Association for the Cultivation of Science in 1994.

The Third World Academy of Science honoured Balasubramanian with the TWAS Prize in 1995 and Iranian Research Organization for Science and Technology (IROST) conferred the Khwarizmi Award of Iran on him in 1996. He received the Om Prakash Bhasin Award and the Kalinga Prize in 1997 and the next year, he received Goyal Prize of the Goyal Research Foundation and J. C. Bose Medal of the Indian National Science Academy (INSA). The Government of India honoured him with the civilian award of Padma Shri in 2002. The Government of France followed suit with the Chevalier de l’Ordre National de Merite, the same year. He received a third award in 2002 from the Department of Science and Technology, the National Prize for Science Popularization. He is also a recipient of the INSA Indira Gandhi Prize and the Jawaharlal Nehru Centenary Award for Achievement in Science of the Indian Science Congress Association (ISCA).

== See also ==
- Crystallin
- Molecular genetics
- Stem cell biology
- Corneal epithelium
