= Centre for DNA Fingerprinting and Diagnostics =

Indian research centre

Centre for DNA Fingerprinting & Diagnostics
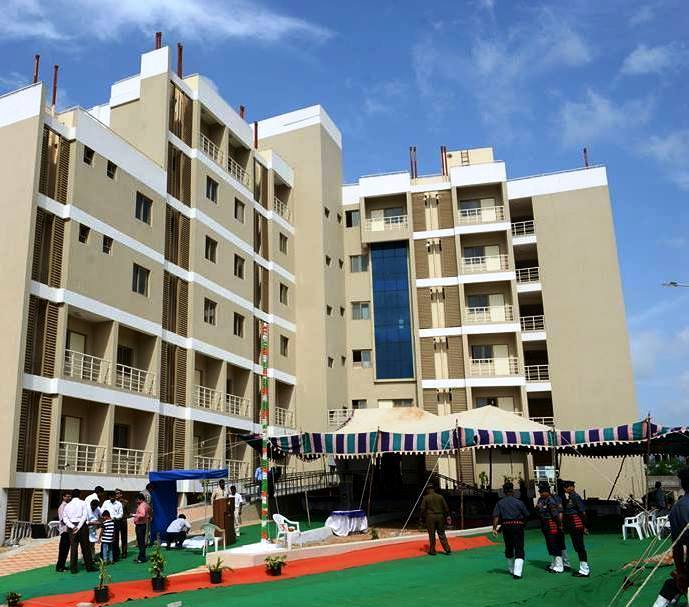
- Type: Autonomous
- Established: 1990; 36 years ago
- Director: K. Thangaraj
- Location: Hyderabad, Telangana, India
- Campus: Urban - Uppal
- Website: cdfd.org.in

Centre for DNA Fingerprinting and Diagnostics (CDFD) is an Indian biotechnology research centre, located in Hyderabad, India, operated by the Department of Biotechnology, Ministry of Science and Technology, Government of India. CDFD is a Sun Microsystems centre of excellence in medical bio-informatics, supported with a strong bioinformatics facility, and is the India node of the EMBnet. In addition, DNA fingerprinting and diagnostics services provided by the centre support some of the activities. The centre utilises the Combined DNA Index System for DNA profile matching. The CDFD and the U.S. Federal Bureau of Investigation signed a memorandum of understanding in 2014 for the acquisition of CODIS.

CDFD receives funding from other agencies like the Wellcome Trust on specific collaborative projects. The centre is recognised by the University of Hyderabad and Manipal University for pursuing a doctor of philosophy in life sciences. Research at CDFD has focused largely on molecular epidemiology of bacterial pathogens, structural genetics, molecular genetics, bioinformatics and computational biology.

== History ==
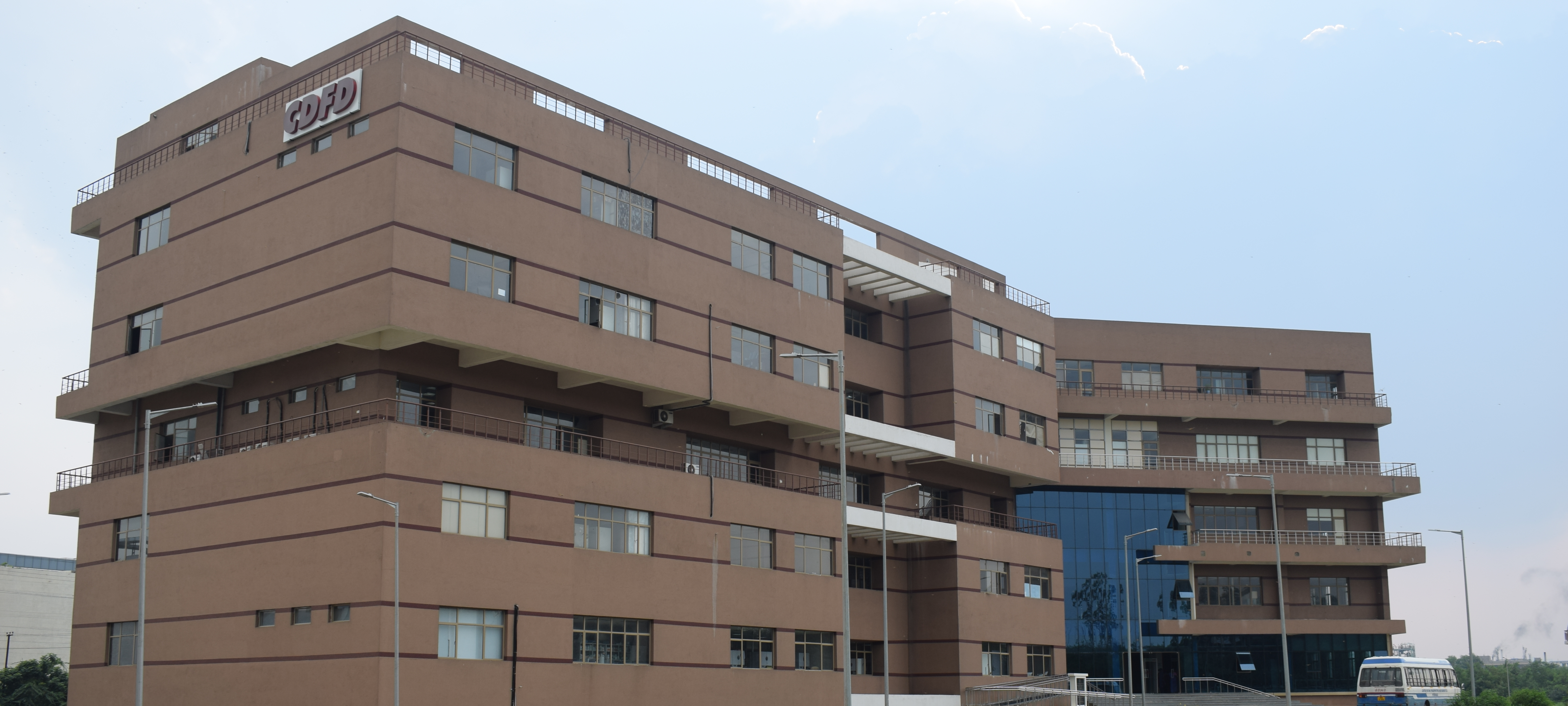
Centre for DNA Fingerprinting and Diagnostics (CDFD), Uppal campus

CDFD was conceptualised by then CCMB director Lalji Singh. It evolved into its current form of a modern institution encompassing both basic and applied research in diverse areas of modern biology under its founder director, Seyed E. Hasnain (former vice-chancellor of the University of Hyderabad), who pursued this aim aggressively during his tenure from 1999 to 2005. The centre is equipped with instrumentation and computing infrastructure to facilitate working in frontier areas of research in life sciences. There are twenty-two groups working on diverse research areas and the centre continues to attract leaders in related disciplines.

== Campus ==
CDFD started its operations at the Centre for Cellular and Molecular Biology, a Council of Scientific and Industrial Research organisation, and was housed in an interim building in Nacharam from early 1999 to December 2008. In 2009, it was moved to a sprawling new building in Gandipet locality at the outskirts of Hyderabad. But, due to some of the governmental objections pertaining to the proximity of the new campus to Osman Sagar lake, any of the wet-lab work was not allowed. As a result, the building raised at Gandipet was completely vacated by CDFD in early 2009 and institute operated from its rented building in Nampally and with an MoU for the diagnostic screening with the Nizam's Institute of Medical Sciences (NIMS).

Following the appointment of Dr. Debashis Mitra as its new director w.e.f. 1 November 2017, CDFD commenced its move to its permanent campus in Uppal, and as of 15 March 2018 the institute is housed in its permanent building next to Nagole Metro Station.

== See also ==
- Wellcome Trust Sanger Institute
- Seyed E. Hasnain
- J. Gowrishankar
- Shekhar C. Mande
- Genome Valley
- Maddika Subba Reddy
