= Ch. Mohan Rao =

Indian molecular biologist (born 1954)

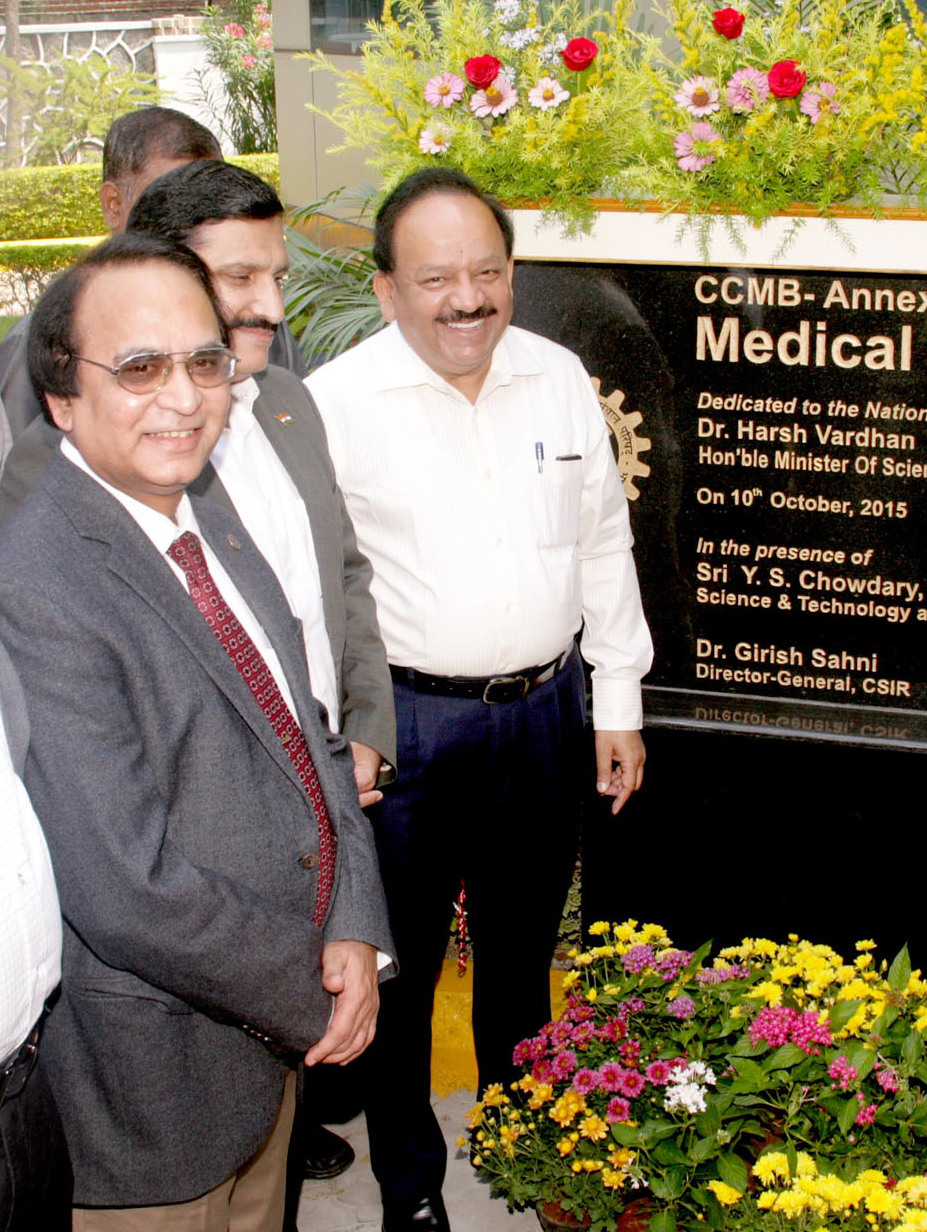
- Ch. Mohan Rao, erstwhile CCMB Director and Union Minister of Health, Harsh Vardhan, unveiling the plaque dedicating CSIR-CCMB's Medical Biotechnology Complex to the Nation.
- Born: Mohan Rao Chintalagiri; 19 January 1954 (age 72); Huzurabad, Hyderabad State (now Telangana), India
- Education: National Eye Institute, University of Hyderabad; Kakatiya University
- Known for: Molecular chaperones, Photoacoustic spectroscopy
- Awards: Shanti Swarup Bhatnagar Prize in Medical Science (1999); Elected Fellow, INSA, NASI, IAS, TWAS
- Scientific career
- Fields: Biophysics, Molecular Biology, Biomedical Science
- Workplaces: Centre for Cellular and Molecular Biology; Scientist (1984-2009); Director (2009-2016); CSIR Distinguished Scientist (2016-2023); Birla Institute of Technology and Science, Pilani, HOD and Senior Professor Emeritus (2024-Present)
- Website: Official website

Mohan Rao Chintalagiri (born 19 January 1954) is an Indian molecular biologist renowned for his contributions to the fields of biophysics and molecular biology. He has earned international recognition for his work on molecular chaperones as well as his contribution to the field of photoacoustic spectroscopy in health and disease. He is currently a Senior Professor Emeritus and Head of the Department of Biological Sciences at the Hyderabad campus of Birla Institute of Technology and Science, Pilani. He is a former director of the Centre for Cellular and Molecular Biology (CCMB) and served as a CSIR-Distinguished Scientist. He received the Shanti Swarup Bhatnagar Prize in 1999, the highest science honor in India.

== Early life and education ==
Ch. Mohan Rao pursued his academic journey at Osmania University, where he obtained a bachelor's degree in botany, zoology, and chemistry in 1975. Subsequently, in 1977, he completed his master's degree in chemistry from Osmania University PG Centre Warangal, presently known as Kakatiya University, Warangal. In 1984, he earned his PhD in chemistry from the University of Hyderabad, focussed on photoacoustic spectroscopy of chemical and biological systems.

== Career ==
Rao's distinguished career includes 30 years of service as a distinguished scientist and subsequently as the director of the Centre for Cellular and Molecular Biology in Hyderabad, India, from 1984 to 2023. Currently, he serves as a Senior Professor Emeritus and Head of the Department of Biological Sciences at the Birla Institute of Technology and Science, Pilani, starting in 2024. Throughout his career, he held prestigious positions globally, including visiting associate at the National Institutes of Health (1990–92), visiting professor at Tokyo Science University, Japan (1996), visiting professor at the University of Texas Medical Branch, and the Institute for Protein Research in Osaka University, Japan. Additionally, he served as an adjunct professor at the Royal Melbourne Institute of Technology.

== Awards and honors ==
Rao's outstanding contributions to science have earned him numerous accolades.

In 1999, he was awarded the Shanti Swarup Bhatnagar Prize for Science and Technology, in the Medical Sciences category, the highest science award in India. Furthermore, he is an elected fellow of esteemed organizations such as the Indian National Science Academy, National Academy of Sciences, India, Indian Academy of Sciences, and The World Academy of Sciences. He was awarded honorary doctorate by the Kakatiya University and distinguished alumnus award by the University of Hyderabad.

== Professional Affiliations ==
Beyond his research and academic achievements, Rao actively contributed to various scientific societies. He served as the president of the Society of Biological Chemists (India), Indian Biophysical Society, Andhra Pradesh Academy of Science, and the Telangana Academy of Sciences. Additionally, he played a key role as an executive committee member for the Centre of Excellence in Bioinformatics at Madurai Kamaraj University.

== See also ==
Centre for Cellular and Molecular Biology
