= Uppal Kalan =

Uppal Uppal Kamaan
- neighborhood
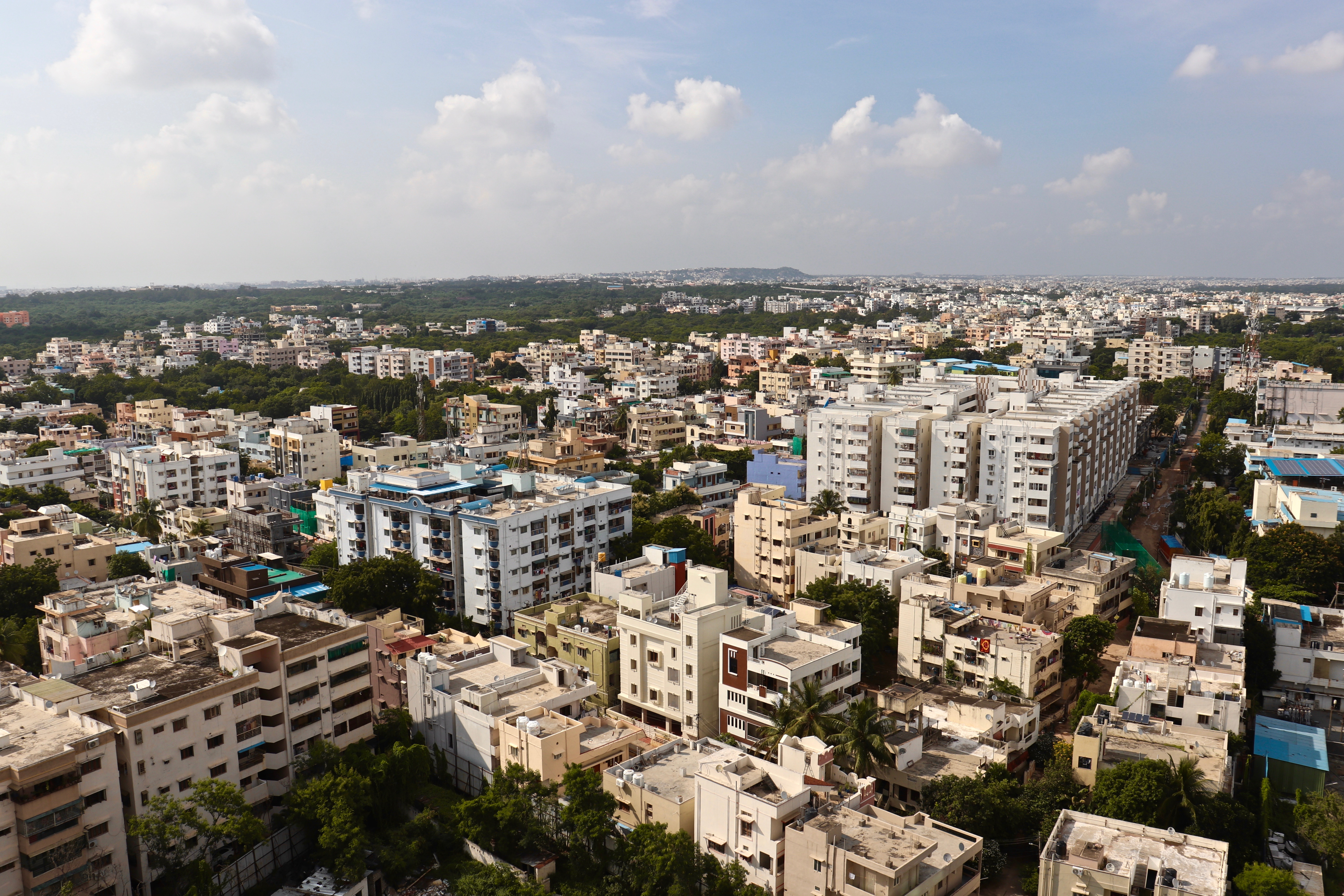
- Aerial view of Uppal

- Location in Hyderabad, India Uppal (India)
- Coordinates: 17.38°N 78.55°E
- Country: India
- State: Telangana
- District: Medchal-Malkajgiri
- City: Hyderabad
- Elevation: 455 m (1,493 ft)

Languages
  - Official: Telugu
- Time zone: UTC+5:30 (IST)
- PIN: 500039
- Telephone code: 91 040
- Vehicle registration: TG-08

Uppal is a neighbourhood in Eastern Hyderabad, Telangana, India. It is the mandal headquarters of Uppal mandal in Keesara revenue division in Medchal-Malkajgiri district. It forms Circle No.2 in the L. B. Nagar Zone of Greater Hyderabad Municipal Corporation. There are four wards i.e., Chilukanagar (7), Habsiguda (8), Ramanthapur (9) and Uppal (10) in this circle.

== Demographics ==
As of 2001 India census, Uppal Kalan had a population of 118,259. Males constitute 52% of the population and females 48%. Uppal Kalan had an average literacy rate of 73%, higher than the national average of 59.5%: male literacy is 80%, and female literacy is 66%. In Uppal Kalan, 12% of the population is under 6 years of age.

In 1991, it had a population of 78,644. The recorded growth rate of this area in 10 years (1991–2001) was about 56 percent.

== Etymology and history ==
It was a municipality prior to its merger into the Greater Hyderabad Municipal Corporation Now Present Commissioner is Shri Godhumala Raju. The words khurd and kalan were administrative terminology dating back to Mughal times, to differentiate two areas with the same name based on their size relative to each other. The words khurd ("small") and kalan ("big") are taken from Persian language.

== Education ==
- St. Marks High School
- Global Indian International School
- Little Flower School
- Little Flower Junior College
- Little Flower Degree College
- Monfort Play School/Little Flower Play School
- Aurora Technical Research Institute
- Joshi Vidya Niketan School

== Religious Place ==
Sri ayyappa devasthanam survey of India colony uppal, a 52-year-old ayyappa temple 1st ayyappa temple in Hyderabad and Telangana state

Sri Sri Sri Uppalamma Temple is one of the famous temples in the locality. It is near Uppal X roads

Karigiri Venkateshwara Swamy Temple located in Swaroop Nagar Colony is one of well known religious places

Sri Ramachandra Swamy Devasthanam in Beerappagadda is also a well known temple in Uppal

Other religious places include Qutub Shahi Mosque and Chilkanagar Church

== Transport ==
Uppal metro station is located here.

== See also ==
- Uppal (Assembly constituency)
- Rajiv Gandhi International Cricket Stadium
