= Centre for Cellular and Molecular Biology =

Life science research institute in Hyderabad, India

Coordinates: 17.4210°N 78.5410°E

- Motto: Dedicated to the Nation
- Type: Autonomous, Government
- Established: 1977; 49 years ago
- Academic affiliations: CSIR
- Director: Vinay K. Nandicoori
- Location: CSIR-IICT, Uppal Rd, IICT Colony, Habsiguda, Hyderabad, Hyderabad, Telangana, India
- Campus: Urban, 6 acres (24,000 m^{2})
- Website: ccmb.res.in

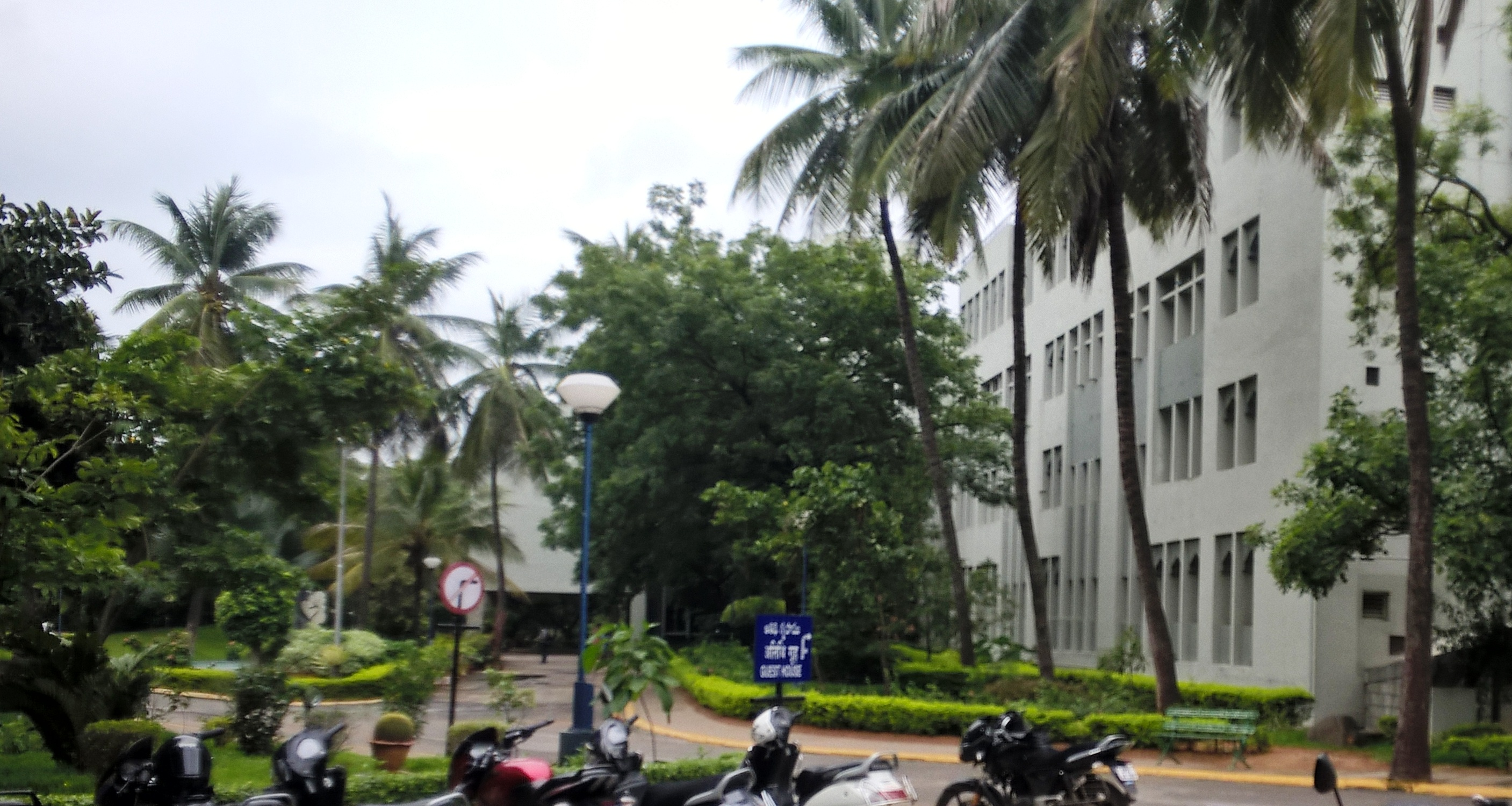
CCMB Hyderabad India

The Centre for Cellular and Molecular Biology (Hindi: कोशिकीय एवं आण्विक जीवविज्ञान केंद्र, IAST: Kośikīya evam āṇavik jīvavijñāna kendra) or CCMB is an Indian fundamental life science research establishment located in Hyderabad that operates under the aegis of the Council of Scientific and Industrial Research. CCMB is a designated "Centre of Excellence" by the Global Molecular and Cell Biology Network, UNESCO.

The center collaborates with the University of Nebraska Medical Center for translational research on glaucoma. In addition, the centre receives funding for specific collaborative projects from establishments outside India, such as the National Institutes of Health, Harvard Medical School and the Massachusetts Institute of Technology in the United States, the Imperial Cancer Research Fund and Cambridge University in the United Kingdom, the India-Japan Science Council and the University of Ryukyus in Japan, Centre Nationale de la Recherche Scientifique and the Pasteur Institute in France and the Volkswagen Foundation in Germany.

== History ==
CCMB was set up initially as a semi-autonomous Centre on 1 April 1977 with the Biochemistry Division of the then Regional Research Laboratory (presently, Indian Institute of Chemical Technology, IICT) in Habsiguda, Hyderabad forming its nucleus and Dr P M Bhargava heading the new Centre. Earlier, the Governing Board of the Council of Scientific and Industrial Research (CSIR) New Delhi, the apex body which constituted 44 research institutions (now 38) in the country, approved the proposal in 1976 to establish such a Centre in view of the importance of research in the frontier and multi-disciplinary areas of modern biology. During 1981–82, the CCMB was accorded the status of a full-fledged national laboratory with its own Executive Committee and Scientific Advisory Council. With major expansion plans, it was decided to relocate the centre to a spacious campus.

== Former directors ==
The list of former directors.

Name	From	To
P. M. Bhargava	April 1977	February 1990
Sharat Chandra	March 1990	May 1992
Dorairajan Balasubramanian	May 1992	May 1998
Lalji Singh	May 1998	July 2009
Ch. Mohan Rao	July 2009	January 2016
Rakesh Kumar Mishra	May 2016	Apr 2021

== Research ==
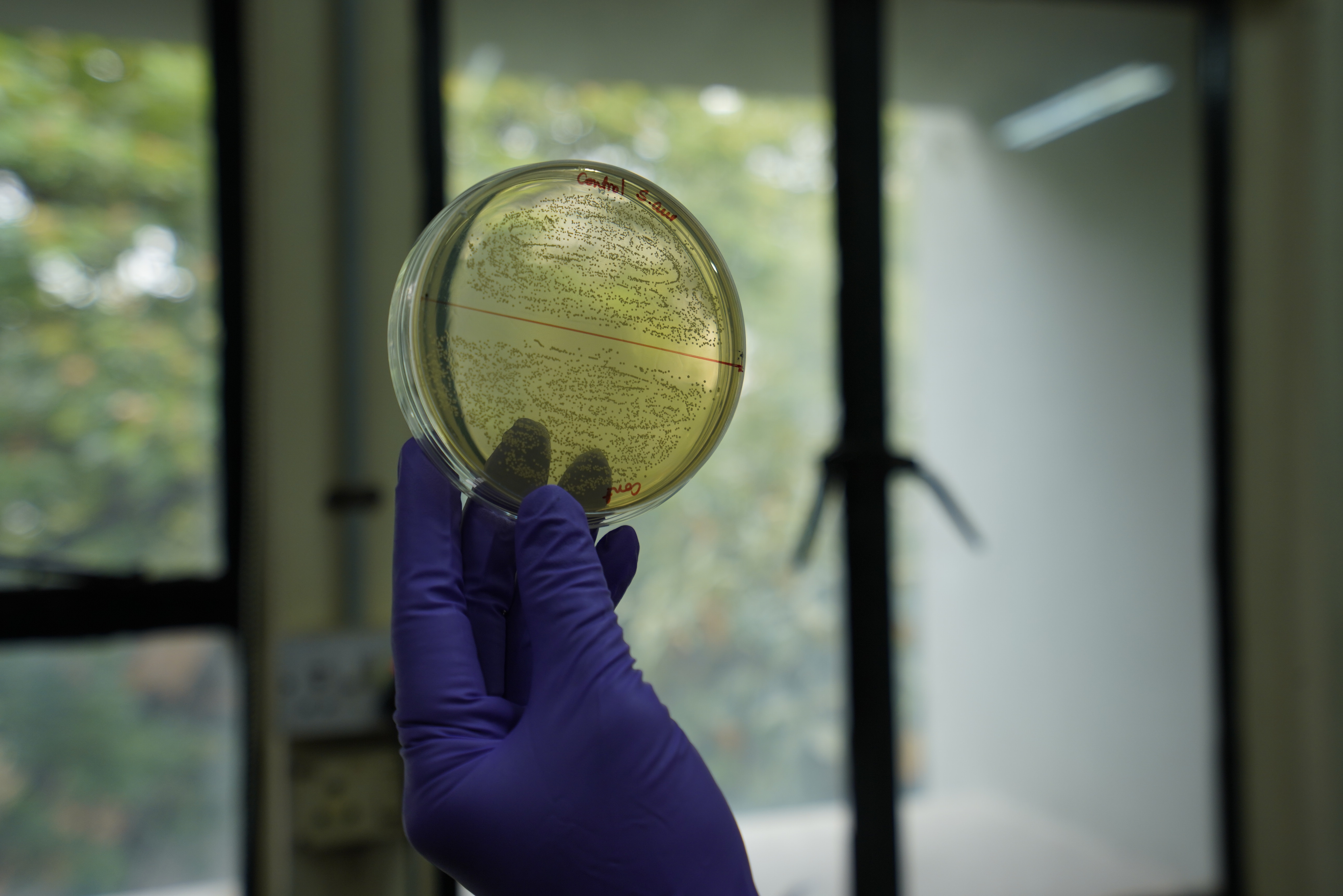
Work on antimicrobial peptides at CCMB

The ongoing research programmes at the CCMB are in three major categories – high quality basic research in the frontier areas of modern biology, research relevant to societal needs, and application-oriented research towards commercialization. These include the areas of evolution & development, gene regulation in prokaryotes and eukaryotes, host-parasite interactions, membrane biology, protein structure, stem cell biology, neurobiology, bioinformatics, functional genomics, ecology and ecosystems.

== Annexe I – LaCONES ==
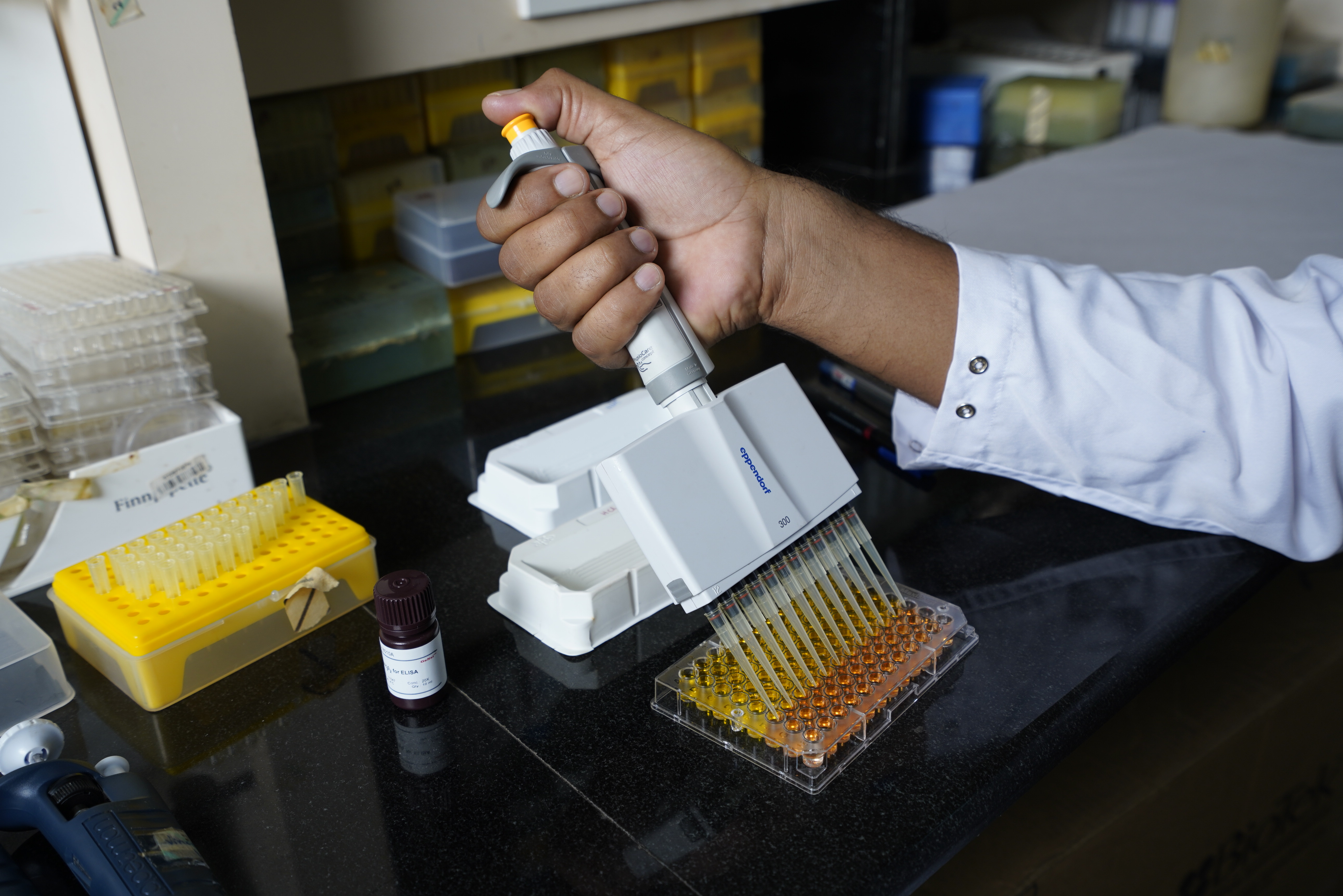
Working with animal samples in LaCONES-CCMB

The Laboratory for the Conservation of Endangered Species is an annexe with the aim to conserve the Indian wildlife by using modern biological techniques and assisted reproductive technologies. It has worked extensively with various departments of the Government of India to curb wildlife crime. They have helped identify the source of animal meat in cases of doubt, sources of smuggled animals, and study stress among wild animals via non-invasive measures. They have helped the Directorate of Aerospace Safety to identify the reason on bird hits, and help them in canopy engineering of their airports. They host the National Wildlife Genetic Resource Bank with currently 250 genetic samples of animals, collected from zoos across the country. They can contain up to 17,000 samples. In the past few years, they have worked with the Nehru Zoological Park, Hyderabad to protect the mouse deer from extinction. In August 2018, they started with the phased release of these animals into their original habitats of Amrabad Tiger Reserve.

== Annexe II – Medical Biotechnology Complex ==
CCMB carries out molecular diagnostic tests for 30 genetic disorders and wildlife forensics its medical biotechnology complex, also known as Innovation Hub (iHUB). It also hosts the Atal Incubation Centre-CCMB (AIC-CCMB) to support early stage life science startups. This initiative is supported by NITI Aayog and Atal Innovation Mission. They have been supporting startups working in drug discovery, drug repurposing, vaccine development, diagnostics, nutrition and nanomaterial development. They now host a Meity Startup Hub to incubate startups that look into big data in life sciences/healthcare sector.

== PhD program in CCMB ==
To join CCMB's PhD program one needs to apply for their application test followed by interviews. Most students join in with their own fellowships from CSIR, UGC, DBT, ICMR, or DST. There are two rounds of intake each year, one in January (interviews are held in December), and the other in July (interviews are held in June).

Most alumni from CCMB's PhD program have continued in academia or joined the life science industry in India and abroad. They are present in premier research and educational institutes of India including IISc, IISERs, NISER and IITs and many central and state universities.

== Collaborations ==
The centre actively collaborates with life scientists in India and abroad. The list of national collaborations run with premier research institutes as well as universities. This list of present and past collaborations includes Tata Institute of Fundamental Research, inStem, ICAR-Indian Institute of Rice Research, University of Hyderabad, CSIR-Institute of Genomics and Integrative Biology, ICAR-National Research Centre on Meat among multiple others.

The centre has collaborated with the University of Nebraska Medical Center for translational research on glaucoma In addition, the centre receives funding for specific collaborative projects from establishments outside India, such as the National Institutes of Health, Harvard Medical School and Massachusetts Institute of Technology in United States, the Imperial Cancer Research Fund and Cambridge University in United Kingdom, the India-Japan Science Council and the University of Ryukyus in Japan, Centre Nationale de la Recherche Scientifique and the Pasteur Institute in France and the Volkswagen Foundation in Germany.

== Technological achievements ==
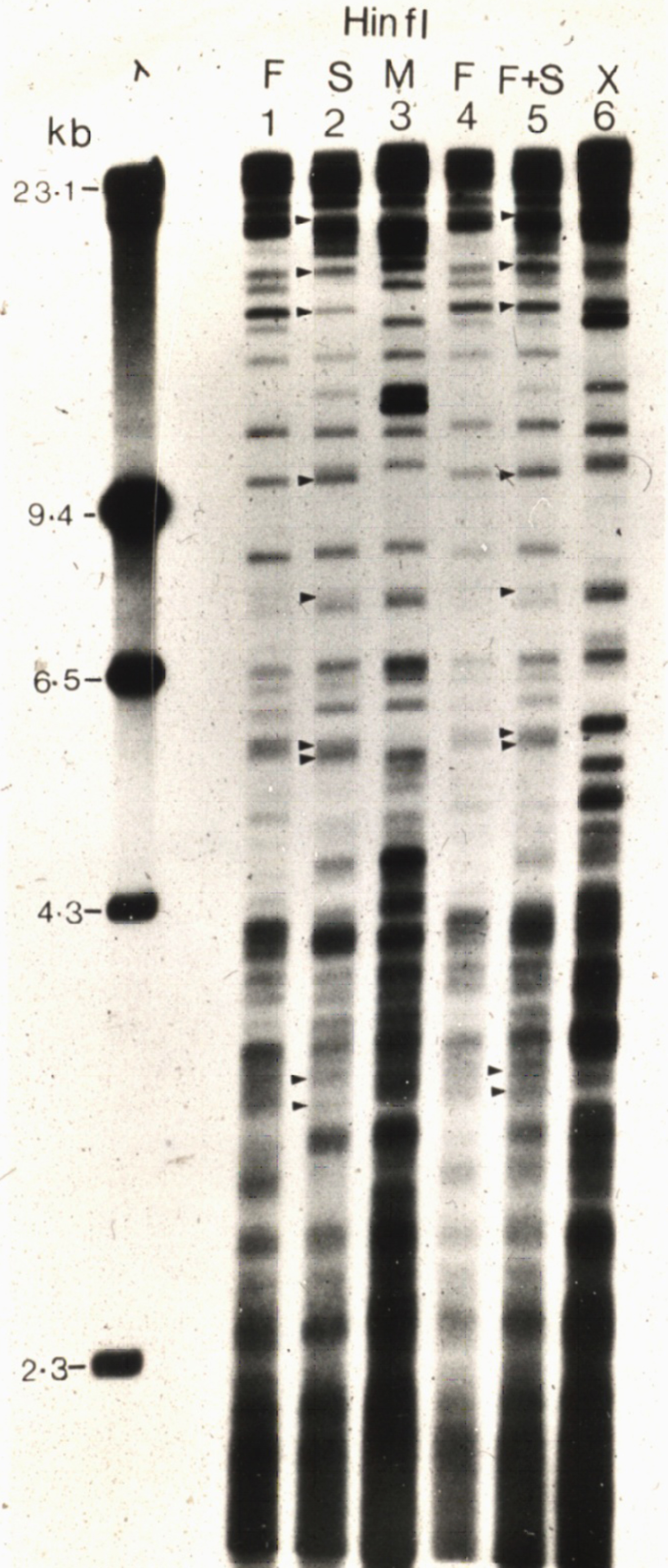
- The first DNA Fingerprinting picture reported in Indian judiciary
  Developed the DNA Fingerprinting Technology in India; and made India the third country in the world to have its own fingerprinting technology
- Developed the universal primer technology that can identify the species of source animal from any animal product
- Discovered the heart disease mutation, carried by 6 crore people among Indians
- Developed the first genetically engineered, gene knockout mouse in India
- Demonstrated the first artificial insemination in spotted deer
- Developed a systematic screening and validation programme for anti-cancer drugs in India
- Discovered the uniqueness of Indian population through genomic studies
- Discovered the origin of the Andaman tribes
- Commercially delivered, recombinant DNA technology based diagnostic kit for detection of pathogens causing ophthalmic infections
- Discovered high yielding and Bacterial Leaf Blight (BLB) disease resistant Improved Samba Mahsuri rice
- Discovered native bacteria, Indibacter alkaliphilus used to generate enzymes and bio-molecules in the industrial biotechnology sector
- Discovered the functionality of microsatellites (simple sequence repeats) among non-coding DNA
- Discovered the gene CPA1, which causes chronic pancreatitis, in collaboration with Asian Institute of Gastroenterology

== Societal Relevance of CCMB ==
- CCMB's students have formed an instrumental workforce in Indian academia.
- CCMB's present and past scientists have also been important in founding and leading many research and educational institutes in India. This includes establishment of the Centre for DNA Fingerprinting and Diagnostics (CDFD) in Hyderabad after the success of DNA fingerprinting technology as an accepted form of evidence in Indian judicial system. Other institutes include InStem, IISER-Pune, IISER-Tirupati and LV Prasad Eye Institute.
- CCMB incubated India's first biotechnology company, Shantha Biotechnics Ltd in the 1990s, and helped them develop their recombinant vaccine against Hepatitis-B, affordable for Indian masses.
- The elite varieties of rice development project aims to help farmers in multiple states of India. The current Improved Samba Mahsuri rice in the market is suited for areas affected by bacterial blight infection.
- CCMB has solved multiple high-profile criminal cases of murders, assassinations and rape using the DNA fingerprinting technology. This includes cases of Rajiv Gandhi, Beant Singh, Naina Sehwal, Priyadarshini Mattoo, Swami Shraddhananda's wife and Swami Premananda.
- The DNA fingerprinting technology also helped in identification of the victims of Singapore Airlines plane crash in 2000.
- The genetic disorder testing facilities offer services at nominal rates, and benefits patients from India as well as the neighbouring countries.
- CCMB trains people in industries as well as for industries through its skill development programs.
- CCMB trains forest and judiciary officials in understanding the DNA fingerprinting technology and the universal primer technology, and how to effectively use them for justice.
- The state of the art instrumentation facilities at CCMB is open for users outside the institute at reasonable costs.
- It is attempting to develop affordable techniques for lab-grown meat.
- It has been instrumental in the fight of COVID-19 in India. It is one of the testing centres for patient samples in Telangana. It also aims to contribute in the basic understanding of the SARS-CoV2 biology to help develop vaccines and drugs.

== Awards and honours ==
In recognition for its contribution to modern biology, CCMB has been chosen as a Centre of Excellence by UNESCO Global Network for Molecular and Cell Biology (MCBN), and has been designated as a South Centre for Excellence for Research and Training by the Third World Academy of Sciences TWAS, Italy. Many prestigious international and national awards have come to CCMB including the CSIR Technology Award (four times) and FICCI Award for outstanding achievements in Science & Technology.

CCMB scientists have 1 Padma Bhushan, 4 Padma Shri, 3 Infosys Prize, 11 Shanti Swarup Bhatnagar awardees along with 14 JC Bose, 3 Third World Academy of Sciences, 24 Indian Academy of Sciences, 20 National Academy of Sciences, and 21 Indian National Science Academy fellows. 10 CCMB scientists have become Directors of educational or research institutes and 6 Vice-Chancellors or Deans in universities or educational institutes of India.

== Reaching CCMB ==
The main campus of CCMB is located on the inner ring road of Hyderabad, connecting the areas Secunderabad and Uppal. CCMB can be reached very conveniently by the city road transport buses and the new Hyderabad metro at Habsiguda.

== See also ==
- Pushpa Mittra Bhargava
- Dorairajan Balasubramanian
- Lalji Singh
- Ch. Mohan Rao
- Jayaraman Gowrishankar
- Ghanshyam Swarup
- Veena Parnaik
- Amitabha Chattopadhyay
- Ramakrishnan Nagaraj
- Ramesh Venkata Sonti
- Imran Siddiqi
- Rakesh Mishra
- Manjula Reddy
- Vinay K. Nandicoori
- Rajan Sankaranarayanan
- Jyotsna Dhawan
- Subhadeep Chatterjee
- Sunil Kumar Verma
- Genome Valley
