= Congenital malaria =

Congenital malaria was first reported in 1876, it is an extremely rare condition which occurs due to transplacental transmission of maternal infection. Maternal prophylactic treatments of malaria can be important when talking about the risk of congenital malaria, as the absences of these treatments can increase the chance for a fetus to contract the disease. A positive cord or peripheral blood smear for malaria in a 24 hour to 7 day old newborn defines congenital malaria. This disease can persist past 7 days old, but after this mark it is then regarded as neonatal malaria rather than congenital.

== Link Between Maternal and Congenital Malaria ==
Maternal malaria is when a woman contracts malaria while pregnant. There is an increased risk of infection and severe malaria in women who are pregnant compared to women who are not. The depression of cell-mediated immunity is thought to be the cause of the increased risk of severity. The effects of malaria on pregnancy aren't the same risks as congenital malaria, the risks for maternal malaria include low birth weight, spontaneous abortion, congenital infection, stillbirth, preterm delivery, and maternal death.

With maternal malaria, prophylactic treatments of malaria may reduce the risk of congenital malaria. It's recommended that pregnant women travelling to endemic regions start prophylactic treatments and the continue them after returning, which will help with reducing the risk of placental transmission.

== Symptoms and Prevalence ==
The most common clinical features include fever, anemia, and splenomegaly. More rare clinical features include hepatomegaly, jaundice, feeding issues, diarrhea, drowsiness or restlessness, and cyanosis. Clinical features can commence anywhere from 10 days to 30 days after birth. This is due to the protective effect of transplacentally transmitted antibodies, a naturally low iron level, and fetal hemoglobin. There's a chance that due to a delay in and non-specific presentation of symptoms from congenital malaria, it may be widely under-reported.

Prevalence of congenital malaria has been wide debated over, and that might be because of the lack of a clear definition of the disease. The prevalence can range anywhere from 0% to 46%, but PCR testing and blood smears among other testing routes aren't the standard of care in endemic regions.

== Treatment ==
The treatment of malaria varies between regions as the different species of Plasmodium require different medications. Treatment with chloroquine has been a success for some cases of P. vivax, but there has been an increased report of chloroquine resistance. In these cases, and cases of P. falciparum and P. ovale, a treatment plan of sulfadoxine-pyrimethamine, artesunate, or a quinine and clindamycin was tried with good results.

== History ==
The first reported case of congenital malaria was reported in 1876. After this, more reported cases of congenital malaria were found and studied in Central Africa as far back as the 1920s and 1930s. Many reports before the 1970s had said that congenital malaria was a rare event with maternal malaria infections. But with the development of more testing methods for congenital malaria there's been a higher reported prevalence in some areas.
