= Malaria prophylaxis =

Medical prevention of malaria

Malaria deaths ihme

Malaria prophylaxis refers to measures used to prevent malaria infection in individuals at risk of exposure to Plasmodium parasites transmitted by Anopheles mosquitoes. These measures include mosquito bite avoidance strategies and the use of antimalarial medications taken before, during, and after exposure. Prophylactic medication is commonly recommended for travelers to endemic regions and for certain populations living in areas with ongoing malaria transmission. The choice of prophylactic strategy depends on factors such as geographic location, parasite resistance patterns, patient characteristics, and duration of exposure.

Several malaria vaccines are under development, and while current vaccines are somewhat effective, more research is needed for sustained malaria control.

Malaria prophylaxis at a large scale has been hindered by barriers to funding and cultural barriers within Africa. The barriers to funding include disruptions in foreign aid, such as decreases in US funding, and persistent corruption within the mostly African countries the aid is flowing to. The cultural barriers include a varying local beliefs that certain medications cannot be trusted or that alternative medicine should be used in place of Western medicine. However, programs are in place to increase malaria awareness at national and local levels in these countries.

Most adults from endemic areas have a degree of long-term infection, which tends to recur, and also possess partial immunity (resistance); the resistance reduces with time, and such adults may become susceptible to severe malaria if they have spent a significant amount of time in non-endemic areas. They are strongly recommended to take full precautions if they return to an endemic area.

== Strategies for prevention ==
- Bite prevention—clothes that cover as much skin as possible, insect repellent, insecticide-impregnated bed nets and indoor residual spraying
- Chemoprophylaxis—chemical treatment of the disease

Continual improvements in malaria prevention strategies have further enhanced its effectiveness in combating areas highly infected with the malaria parasite. The World Health Organization (WHO) recommends both vector control, or the prevention of mosquito contact, and various chemotherapies, including treatments during and after pregnancy, to best prevent malaria occurrences.

=== Bite prevention ===
Mosquito bite avoidance is a core component of malaria prophylaxis because malaria is transmitted exclusively through the bites of infected female Anopheles mosquitoes. Preventive measures include the use of insecticide-treated bed nets, topical insect repellents containing DEET or picaridin, and protective clothing that minimizes exposed skin. Indoor residual spraying with insecticides has also been shown to reduce malaria transmission in endemic regions. Bite avoidance strategies are particularly important in areas where antimalarial drug resistance limits the effectiveness of chemoprophylaxis.

== Medications ==
In choosing the agent, it is important to weigh the risk of infection against the risks and side effects associated with the medications.

=== Disruptive prophylaxis ===
An experimental approach involves preventing the parasite from binding with red blood cells by blocking calcium signalling between the parasite and the host cell. Erythrocyte-binding-like proteins (EBLs) and reticulocyte-binding protein homologues (RHs) are both used by specialized P. falciparum organelles known as rhoptries and micronemes to bind with the host cell. Disrupting the binding process can stop the parasite.

Monoclonal antibodies were used to interrupt calcium signalling between PfRH1 (an RH protein), EBL protein EBA175 and the host cell. This disruption completely stopped the binding process.

=== Suppressive prophylaxis ===
Chloroquine, proguanil, mefloquine, and doxycycline are suppressive prophylactics. This means that they are only effective at killing the malaria parasite once it has entered the erythrocytic stage (blood stage) of its life cycle, and therefore have no effect until the liver stage is complete. That is why these prophylactics must continue to be taken for four weeks after leaving the area of risk.

Mefloquine, doxycycline, and atovaquone-proguanil appear to be equally effective at reducing the risk of malaria for short-term travelers and are similar with regard to their risk of serious side effects. Mefloquine is sometimes preferred due to its once a week dose, however mefloquine is not always as well tolerated when compared with atovaquone-proguanil. There is low-quality evidence suggesting that mefloquine and doxycycline are similar with regards to the number of people who discontinue treatments due to minor side effects. People who take mefloquine may be more likely to experience minor side effects such as sleep disturbances, depressed mood, and an increase in abnormal dreams. There is very low quality evidence indicating that doxycycline use may be associated with an increased risk of indigestion, photosensitivity, vomiting, and yeast infections, when compared with mefloquine and atovaquone-proguanil.

=== Chemoprophylaxis ===
Antimalarial chemoprophylaxis involves the use of medications to prevent malaria infection or suppress parasitemia following exposure to Plasmodium species. Commonly used prophylactic agents include atovaquone-proguanil, doxycycline, mefloquine, and chloroquine, depending on regional resistance patterns.. Some medications act as suppressive prophylaxis by targeting blood-stage parasites, while others provide causal prophylaxis by acting on liver-stage parasites. Selection of an appropriate prophylactic regimen requires consideration of drug side effects, contraindications, patient adherence, and travel itinerary.

=== Causal prophylaxis ===
Causal prophylactics target not only the blood stages of malaria, but the initial liver stage as well. This means that the user can stop taking the drug seven days after leaving the area of risk. Malarone and primaquine are the only causal prophylactics in use.

=== Regimens ===
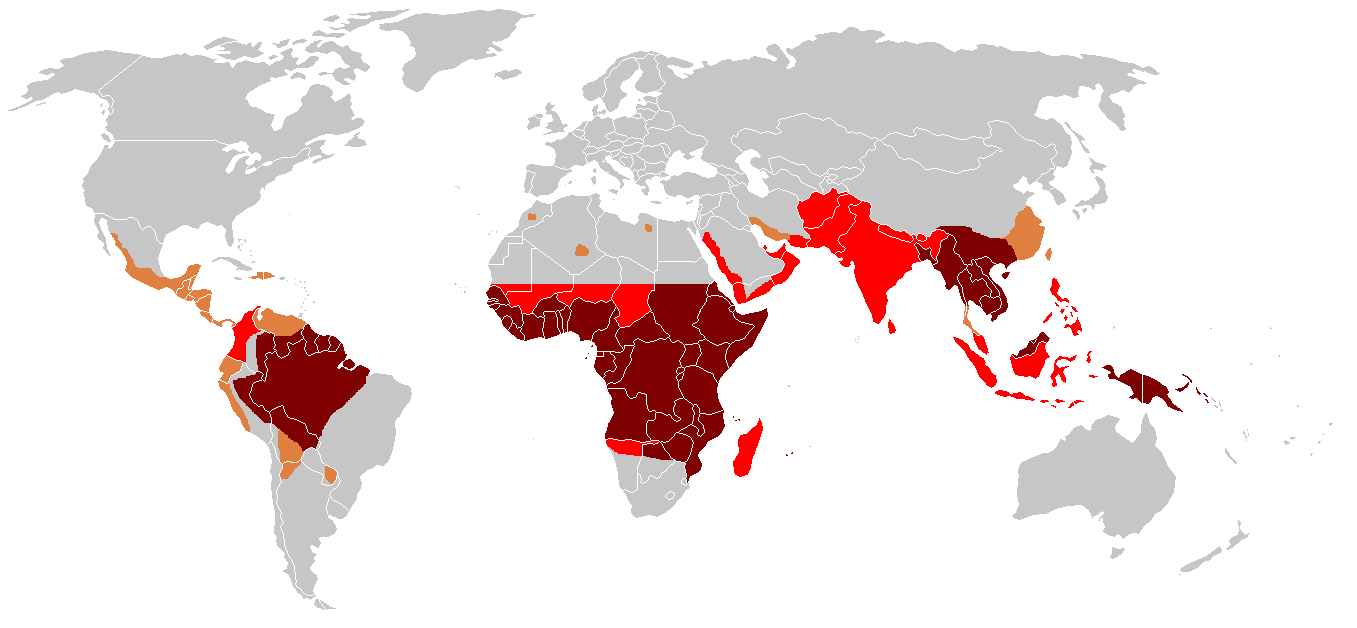
Distribution of malaria in the world : ♦ Elevated occurrence of chloroquine- or multi-resistant malaria : ♦ Occurrence of chloroquine-resistant malaria : ♦ No Plasmodium falciparum or chloroquine-resistance : ♦ No malaria

Specific regimens are recommended by the WHO, UK HPA and CDC for prevention of P. falciparum infection. HPA and WHO advice are broadly in line with each other (although there are some differences). CDC guidance frequently contradicts HPA and WHO guidance.

These regimens include:

- doxycycline 100 mg once daily (started one day before travel, and continued for four weeks after returning);
- mefloquine 250 mg once weekly (started two and a half weeks before travel, and continued for four weeks after returning);
- atovaquone/proguanil (Malarone) 1 tablet daily (started one day before travel, and continued for one week after returning). Can also be used for therapy in some cases.

In areas where chloroquine remains effective:

- chloroquine 300 mg once weekly, and proguanil 200 mg once daily (started one week before travel, and continued for four weeks after returning);
- hydroxychloroquine 400 mg once weekly (started one to two weeks before travel and continued for four weeks after returning)

What regimen is appropriate depends on the person who is to take the medication as well as the country or region travelled to. This information is available from the UK HPA, WHO or CDC (links are given below). Doses depend also on what is available (e.g., in the US, mefloquine tablets contain 228 mg base, but 250 mg base in the UK). The data is constantly changing and no general advice is possible.

Doses given are appropriate for adults and children aged 12 and over.

Other chemoprophylactic regimens that have been used on occasion:

- Dapsone 100 mg and pyrimethamine 12.5 mg once weekly (available as a combination tablet called Maloprim or Deltaprim): this combination is not routinely recommended because of the risk of agranulocytosis;
- Primaquine 30 mg once daily (started the day before travel, and continuing for seven days after returning): this regimen is not routinely recommended because of the need for G-6-PD testing prior to starting primaquine (see the article on primaquine for more information).
- Quinine sulfate 300 to 325 mg once daily: this regimen is effective but not routinely used because of the unpleasant side effects of quinine.

Prophylaxis against Plasmodium vivax requires a different approach given the long liver stage of this parasite. This is a highly specialist area.

== Vaccines ==
In November 2012, findings from a Phase III trials of an experimental malaria vaccine known as RTS,S reported that it provided modest protection against both clinical and severe malaria in young infants. The efficacy was about 30% in infants 6 to 12 weeks of age and about 50% in infants 5 to 17 months of age in the first year of the trial.

The RTS,S vaccine was engineered using a fusion hepatitis B surface protein containing epitopes of the outer protein of Plasmodium falciparum malaria sporozite, which is produced in yeast cells. It also contains a chemical adjuvant to boost the immune system response. The vaccine is being developed by PATH and GlaxoSmithKline (GSK), which has spent about $300 million on the project, plus about $200 million more from the Bill and Melinda Gates Foundation.

=== Preventative chemotherapy in endemic regions ===
In malaria-endemic regions, preventive chemotherapy is used to reduce malaria morbidity and mortality in high-risk populations. Seasonal malaria chemoprevention is recommended for children in areas with highly seasonal transmission patterns. Intermittent preventive treatment is used during pregnancy and infancy to reduce adverse outcomes associated with malaria infection. These population-level strategies complement vector control measures and are a key component of global malaria control effort.

== Barriers to prevention ==
A variety of factors combine to make malaria prophylaxis more difficult to achieve. These mainly fall into two categories: issues with funding and issues with cultural acceptance of treatments.

=== Funding ===
==== Corruption ====
Although funding for malaria prevention has increased dramatically beginning around 2001, corruption has hindered efforts to ensure all funding goes to the proper places. Examples of this corruption are found in multiple countries across Africa.

- Uganda has had funding from Global Fund to Fight AIDS, Tuberculosis and Malaria cut in 2005 and 2007 due to continual thefts of grant money. It was audited in 2008/2009 by the Global Fund and deemed an unsafe location for Global Fund resources. A further audit in 2015 exposed more corruption, including stolen drugs and use of expired test kits for HIV. A 2017 clarification by the Global Fund admitted that some, but not all, of the suspected corruption was due to management error. However, there has been no indication that the systemic corruption will stop soon.
- Burkina Faso was investigated by the Global Fund in 2010 for misuse of grants for insecticide-treated mosquito nets. The investigation found that the total amount of misappropriated funds was €9 million. Difficulties with the stability of the Burkina Faso government have resulted in issues retrieving the lost money.
- Nigeria had a $100 million loan from the Islamic Development Bank stopped in May 2025 because of an investigation into the Nigerian company using the money, which was subsequently found guilty of collusion in obtaining the contract.

==== End of USAID ====
Throughout the first half of 2025, the Trump administration shut down USAID, the lead humanitarian aid arm of the US government. This shutdown included the cancellation of 83% of all USAID-managed foreign aid programs and 80% of all malaria-specific awards. While exact numbers are difficult to procure, this loss in funding for malaria prevention could total around $1 billion annually.

=== Cultural backlash ===
A systematic review of 39 studies conducted across Sub-Saharan Africa reported that many cultures had existing beliefs that clashed with their ability to accept malaria treatments and prevention strategies. In particular, most of the communities surveyed did not properly understand how malaria is transmitted, and many expressed suspicion about the effectiveness of conventional medications, including vaccines. Other factors reported included the practice of ceasing treatment of malaria once symptoms vanished, and in some areas the belief that injections could kill children who had already developed malaria.

However, efforts to increase local knowledge of malaria through Approaches to Community Engagement (ACE) have raised awareness across Sub-Saharan Africa. A review of 75 studies that included that area stated that in the last twenty years, intervention efforts have greatly increased community awareness about malaria. These efforts usually start with informing the leaders of communities and educators, but the review notes that for long-term success, national programs must also work with the rest of the communities, including religious leaders, private stakeholders, and all civil authorities.

== History ==
Malaria is one of the oldest known pathogens, and began having a major impact on human survival about 10,000 years ago with the birth of agriculture. The development of virulence in the parasite has been demonstrated using genomic mapping of samples from this period, confirming the emergence of genes conferring a reduced risk of developing the malaria infection. References to the disease can be found in manuscripts from ancient Egypt, India and China, illustrating its wide geographical distribution. The first treatment identified is thought to be quinine, one of four alkaloids from the bark of the Cinchona tree. Originally it was used by the tribes of Ecuador and Peru for treating fevers. Its role in treating malaria was recognized and recorded first by an Augustine monk from Lima, Peru in 1633. Seven years later the drug had reached Europe and was being used widely with the name 'the Jesuit's powder'. From this point onwards the use of Quinine and the public interest in malaria increased, although the compound was not isolated and identified as the active ingredient until 1820. By the mid-1880s the Dutch had grown vast plantations of cinchona trees and monopolized the world market.

Quinine remained the only available treatment for malaria until the early 1920s. During the First World War German scientists developed the first synthetic antimalarial compound, Atabrine, which was followed by Resochin and Sontochin derived from four-amino quinoline compounds. After capturing Tunisia during the Second World War, American scientists acquired and altered the drugs to produce chloroquine.

The development of new antimalarial drugs spurred the World Health Organization in 1955 to attempt a global malaria eradication campaign. This was successful in much of Brazil, the US and Egypt but ultimately failed elsewhere. Efforts to control malaria are still continuing, with the development of drug-resistant parasites presenting increasingly difficult problems.

The CDC publishes recommendations for travels advising about the risk of contracting malaria in various countries.

Some of the factors in deciding whether to use chemotherapy as malaria pre-exposure prophylaxis include the specific itinerary, length of trip, cost of drug, previous adverse reactions to antimalarials, drug allergies, and personal medical history.

== See also ==
- Malaria prevention
- Mosquito control
