= Intermittent preventive therapy =

Public health intervention

Intermittent preventive therapy or intermittent preventive treatment (IPT) is a public health intervention aimed at treating and preventing malaria episodes in infants (IPTi), children (IPTc), schoolchildren (IPTsc) and pregnant women (IPTp). The intervention builds on two tested malaria control strategies to clear existing parasites (treatment effect seen in mass drug administrations) and to prevent new infections (prophylaxis).

== IPTi ==
IPTi using the antimalarial drug sulfadoxine/pyrimethamine (S/P) was pioneered in Ifakara, Tanzania in 1999. Infants received S/P at ages 3, 6, and 9 months in combination with their routine childhood (EPI) vaccinations. IPTi reduced clinical attacks of malaria by 59% (95% CI, 41%–72%) in Ifakara. Remarkably, protection persisted throughout the second year of life, long after SP had disappeared from circulation. A trial conducted in northern Tanzania using the antimalarial drug amodiaquine instead of S/P was similarly successful. Six subsequent trials showed less encouraging results.

The latest and so far largest IPTi study was an effectiveness study conducted in the South East of Tanzania. A study area of approximately 250x180km2 with a population of about 900,000 people was subdivided into 24 similar clusters. Half of the 23,400 infants, those residing in 12 of 24 randomly selected clusters were invited in 2005 to receive IPTi. Between 47 and 76% of the eligible infants in each of the 12 selected clusters received IPT-SP. In the following year, 2006, the effect of IPTi on malaria and anaemia was assessed in a representative sample of 600 infants. An intention to treat analysis, which includes all eligible infants did not show a statistically significant benefit of IPTi-SP. Parasitaemia prevalence was 31% in the intervention and 38% in the comparison areas (p=0.06). In a ‘per protocol’ analysis, which only included infants who actually received IPTi there was a significant benefit: parasite prevalence was 22%, 19 percentage points lower than comparison children in the control group (p=0.01). This trial showed that IPTi has a protective effect at the individual level but is not effective at the community level. The study had followed up children for two years until 2007 but the findings from the surveillance in 2007 have not been reported.

== IPTc ==
Treating children with S/P and artesunate in Senegal where malaria is highly seasonal repeatedly during the malaria season reduced malaria attacks by 86% (95% CI 80-90)9. A subsequent trial in Mali showed a protective efficacy of 43% [95% CI 29–54%].

== IPTsc ==
Treating schoolchildren in Kenya with S/P and amodiaquine significantly improved anaemia (RR 0.52, 95% CI 0.29-0.93).

== IPTp ==
IPTp consists in the administration of a single curative dose of an efficacious anti-malarial drug at least twice during pregnancy – regardless whether or not the woman is infected. The drug is administered under supervision during antenatal care (ANC) visits. Sulfadoxine-pyrimethamine is the drug currently recommended by the WHO because of its safety and efficacy in pregnancy. Several studies have shown the high efficacy of IPTp with SP, compared to placebo or CQ prophylaxis, on placental infection, LBW and/or severe maternal anaemia. More recent findings from Tanzania also suggest that IPTp using S/P has reached the end of its lifecycle. The authors found that the "use of partially effective anti-malarial agents for IPTp may exacerbate malaria infections in the setting of widespread drug resistance". As for infants, there is no simple readily available replacement of S/P for malaria in pregnancy. Indeed, the fear of teratogenic effects add a layer of complexity how this intervention will evolve.

== Controversy ==
While some controversial aspects e.g. the drug of choice are shared by all forms of intermittent preventive therapy, the controversy has been reported in greatest detail for IPTi (see also politics below). The reasons which make the large scale introduction of IPTi highly controversial include:

1. The six studies reported subsequent to the first 2 IPTi studies did not confirm the same degree of protection against malaria (59%) nor the protracted period of protective benefit (into the second year of life) seen in that initial study. Subsequent studies indicated that protection lasted about 35 days after each treatment dose, which translates into an overall protective efficacy in infancy of 20–33%.
2. Effects on anaemia and hospital admission were inconsistent between study sites.
3. There was no evidence of mortality reduction. In more than 8,000 children enrolled in IPTi studies, there were 152 deaths in the placebo groups and 157 deaths in the sulfadoxine-pyrimethamine groups: a protective efficacy of –2% (95% CI –22 to 21).
4. There were concerns that any benefits shown in these IPTi-SP trials might be less now that resistance to sulfadoxine-pyrimethamine has worsened. A recent trial of S/P conducted in Tanzania had to be closed early because of high mortality in children receiving S/P.
5. There was uncertainty over the true incidence of serious adverse effects, notably the cutaneous reactions that stopped the use of sulfadoxine pyrimethamine as prophylaxis.

An added theoretical concern is that the widespread use of antimalarial drugs for prophylaxis will add to the already considerable drug pressure and will facilitate the emergence and spread of drug resistance. McGready summarised IPTi as an intervention which uses the wrong drug, probably in the wrong dose in the wrong age group.

== Politics ==
The politics of IPTi are well documented and illustrate the working of contemporary international health politics. The promising results of the first two IPTi studies led to the creation of the IPTi Consortium, whose brief is to determine the efficacy, safety, relation of efficacy to drug sensitivity, cost-effectiveness, and acceptability of this intervention. The IPTi Consortium received approximately US$28 million from the Bill & Melinda Gates Foundation (BMGF). A WHO technical advisory group reviewed the evidence relevant for the widespread introduction of IPTi available in 2008, and came to the conclusion that the available evidence was not sufficient to recommend the widespread introduction of IPTi -SP. Program officers of the BMGF as well as scientists funded by the BMGF criticised the WHO conclusions. The criticism from the BMGF in turn triggered a memorandum of the WHO malaria chief Dr. Akira Kochi to the director general of the WHO which was leaked to The New York Times.

Dr. Kochi wrote, although it was less and less straightforward that the health agency should recommend IPTi, the agency's objections were met with intense and aggressive opposition from Gates-backed scientists and the foundation. The W.H.O., he wrote, needs to stand up to such pressures and ensure that the review of evidence is rigorously independent of vested interests.

At the request of Dr. Brandling-Bennett of the BMGF and with funding from the BMGF, the Institute of Medicine (IOM) convened an expert committee to evaluate the evidence concerning IPTi - SP and provide guidance on the value of continued investment in IPTi-SP. The committee was chaired by Myron M. Levine who has been funded and is currently funded by the BMGF. The committee concluded "… that an intervention with results of this magnitude is worthy of further investment as part of a public health strategy to decrease morbidity from malaria infections in infants." The WHO technical expert group responded to the IOM report "WHO is committed to review the available information each year." Dr. Kochi was ultimately replaced by one of the members of the IPTi consortium, Dr. Robert Newman. In March 2010, i.e. after Dr. Kochi had been replaced, the WHO recommended the co-administration of the antimalarial drug sulfadoxine pyrimethamine with routine childhood vaccinations (DTP2, DTP3 and measles immunization) in sub-Saharan Africa. The recommendation applies only for areas with high malaria transmission and low resistance against SP, both measures are not free of controversy and only available for few spots in Africa. With the recent drop of malaria transmission in wide stretches of Africa and a steady increase in SP resistance few malaria control programs will hurry to implement this intervention.
