= Aminoquinoline =

Aminoquinolines are derivatives of quinoline, most notable for their roles as antimalarial drugs. Depending upon the location of the amino group, they can be divided into:

- 4-Aminoquinoline
- 8-Aminoquinoline
