= C9H8N2 =

The molecular formula C_{9}H_{8}N_{2} (molar mass: 144.17 g/mol, exact mass: 144.0687 u) may refer to:

- 4-Aminoquinoline
- 8-Aminoquinoline
