= Liu Xu (chemist) =

Chinese pharmaceutical chemist (1938–2019)

- 刘旭
- Born: 29 September 1938; Rudong, Jiangsu, China
- Died: September 5, 2019 (aged 80); Guilin, China
- Citizenship: Chinese
- Education: China Pharmaceutical University
- Known for: Discovering Artesunate
- Awards: State Award for Inventions (1989); China Patent Award (1991); State Science and Technology Progress Award (2002)
- Scientific career
- Fields: Medicinal chemistry Antimalarial medication Clinical research
- Workplaces: Guilin Pharmaceutical Co., Ltd

Liu Xu (Chinese: 刘旭; 29 September 1938 – 5 September 2019) was a Chinese pharmaceutical chemist known for the discovery of artesunate, a novel antimalarial drug. The discovery of artesunate solves the problem that artemisinin is nearly insoluble in water. Artesunate can be given by intravenous injection, intramuscular injection, by mouth, and by rectum.

For his work, Liu received the 1989 state award for inventions and the 2002 State Science and Technology Progress Award.

== Early life ==
Liu Xu was born in Rudong, Jiangsu, China, on 29 December 1938. Xu Liu studied at the Department of Pharmacy in China Pharmaceutical University and graduated in 1959. From August 1959 to 1961, Liu Xu took part in the project of synthesizing new varieties of sulfa drugs in the Beijing Institute of Pharmaceutical Industry. In 1961, he moved to Guilin Pharmaceutical as part of the Third Front Movement to develop basic industry and national security industry in China's interior.

== Research career ==
On May 21, 1977, the Office of Project 523 gave Guilin Pharmaceutical the task of revising the structure of artemisinin in order to improve the drug's effect and solve the water solubility problem. Liu Xu was appointed to be the leader of this project. Liu created a series of derivatives and finally found Derivative No 804, later named as artesunate, which has 3 to 7 times more efficacy in malaria treatment than artemisinin and can be manufactured into water-soluble preparations. It is possible to use artesunate for intravenous injection, so it can be used to treat severe malaria.

On Oct 4th 1981, in the Malaria Chemotherapy Seminar held by WHO, artesunate was chosen as a priority development project.

The artesunate project won the third prize of the National Invention Award in 1989. On 1988 Oct 29th artesunate obtained patent authorization from China Patent Office.

In 1996 Zhou Guangzhao, dean of CAS at that time, released a reward list for artemisinin research results, including 10 scientists who made major contributions to the project. Liu Xu's name was on the list due to his role in the creation of artesunate.

== Awards ==
- 1989, State Award for Inventions (1st inventor)
- 1991, China Patent Award
- 1992, (One of the) Ten Science and Technology Achievements in China, State Science Commission, China
- 2002, State Science and Technology Progress Award
