= Amazon Malaria Initiative =

The Amazon Malaria Initiative (AMI) was a regional program that was created in 2001 by several countries sharing the Amazon basin with technical support from PAHO/WHO and financial support from the U.S. Agency for International Development (USAID), and managed by USAID/Peru as part of its South American Regional Infectious Disease Program (SARI). The initiative used a multi-pronged approach to achieve the overall aims of preventing and controlling malaria and reducing malaria-related morbidity and mortality in countries of the Americas. AMI priorities for malaria prevention are as follows, diagnosis and treatment, drug resistance and epidemiological surveillance, vector control, pharmaceutical management, quality of medicines, communication and networking.

== History ==
The rationale for creating AMI was the need to provide and invest in targeted activities to improve malaria control in the Amazon basin countries where 88% of malaria cases in Latin America and the Caribbean are reported. The Americas also where medication used to treat P. falciparum malaria are being reported to be ineffective. Nearly 95% of the malaria burden in the Americas is located in the Amazon basin region, as well as 98% of the Plasmodium falciparum infection. When AMI first launched the initial participating countries included Brazil, Colombia, Ecuador, Guyana, Peru, Suriname, Bolivia, and Venezuela. By 2008 Venezuela ceased participation, Bolivia followed in 2013. AMI later expanded to eleven countries adding Central American countries Belize, Guatemala, Honduras, Nicaragua, and Panama.

== Description ==
AMI's approach to enhance malaria control in the eleven participating countries was to identify, support, and implement evidence-based interventions. AMI partners share knowledge and lessons learned by networking across different countries, both in the Americas and around the world. AMI hopes that all participating countries will develop strong health systems, strategic planning programs, monitoring, and evaluation, operational research and country level capacity-building. To achieve the malaria control objective, AMI created the following set of goals and priorities.

=== Goals ===
1. Ensure malaria control programs incorporate selected best practices
2. Improve malaria control at the sub-regional level
3. Contribute to decrease malaria morbidity and mortality

=== Priorities ===
Provide effective malaria control and treatment by:

- Assessing efficacy of currently used medicines and suitable replacements
- Choosing and implementing new treatment policies
- Improving diagnostics quality assurance and quality control
- Expanding access to diagnostics test and good quality antimalarial medicines
- Strengthening vector surveillance and control and disseminating information

Since AMI has been introduced, the Americas have seen a 60% decrease in reported cases and 70% decrease in death due to malaria. From 2007 to 2008 the Americas reported 30% less cases of malaria as well as a 52% decrease in mortality. By 2008, reports of fatal malaria cases dropped by 83%. There was a decline in incidence rate from 2000 to 2012 in 18 of the 21 endemic countries. By 2015 Brazil, Colombia, and Peru are estimated to achieve reduction of > 75%, while Panama is estimated to achieve a reduction of 25% to 50%. Guyana is the only participating country to report an increase in cases between the years 2000 and 2012. As of 2013 Belize moved from the control phase to the pre-elimination phase joining Ecuador, while the other endemic countries remain in the control phase. Admiral Tim Ziemer, U.S. Global Malaria Coordinator, said the work of PAHO, WHO member countries and the U.S. (supported through the Amazon Malaria Initiative) have been critical to this success.

AMI focused on five priority areas for the AMI region: 1) consolidating the gains achieved during the first ten years of work and contributing further attention to P. vivax malaria and to populations with special needs; 2) making malaria control activities more feasible, independent of AMI contribution; 3) developing a regional approach to malaria prevention and control; 4) helping national malarial control programs contribute to the decentralization effect in the health sector as well as modifying malaria control strategies to divers and emerging epidemiological setting; 5) implementing the Strategy and Plan of Action for Malaria in the Americas for 2011-2015.

=== Strategy and plan of action for malaria ===
In September 2011, countries in the Americas approved a strategy and plan of action for malaria and established key targets for 2015. The Americas plan of action includes a 75% reduction in malaria morbidity as well as 25% reduction in malaria related deaths by 2015. The plan also calls to implement malaria elimination activities in areas where elimination seems possible, reverse trends in countries where malaria case were on the rise, and prevent any reintroduction of malaria in countries deemed malaria-free.

== Amazon Network for the Surveillance of Antimalarial Drug Resistance ==
Through its support for AMI, USAID helped the Pan American Health Organization to create the Amazon Network for the Surveillance of Antimalarial Drug Resistance (RAVREDA). The goal of RAVREDA is to use a network of sentinel sites to monitor medicine efficacy and address antimalarial drug resistance. RAVREDA first launched as an effort to support participating countries to revise their antimalarial drug treatment policies, and promote the implementation of science-based malaria control policies. RAVREDA is a country-led collaborative that monitors the emergence and spread of resistance to antimalarial medicines and addresses the risk of malaria reemergence. The AMI/RAVREDA has assisted countries in the region to develop drug efficacy protocols. REVREDA tailors to local epidemiological situations as well as conducts studies of therapeutic efficacy. The purpose of AMI/RAVREDA is to be the motivating role in partnerships, filling regional gaps, assisting regional and subregional coordination, supporting in the preparation of Global found applications, and creating a foundation for malaria elimination in areas where it seems feasible.

== Current partner countries ==
=== Amazon Basin countries ===
- Brazil
- Colombia
- Ecuador
- Guyana
- Peru
- Suriname

=== Central American countries ===
- Belize
- Guatemala
- Honduras
- Nicaragua
- Panama

== International technical partners ==
AMI activities were executed through the collaborative efforts of the six international partners with varied technical expertise, all of which work in close coordination with one another as well as with the national counterpart stakeholders.

- U.S. Agency for International Development (USAID)
- Pan American Health Organization / World Health Organization (PAHO/WHO)
- Centers for Disease Control and Prevention (CDC)
- Management Sciences for Health (MSH)/Systems for Improved Access to Pharmaceuticals and Services (SIAPS)
- United States Pharmacopeial Convention (USP)
- Links Media
