= Amodiaquine =

Chemical compound

Clinical data
- Trade names: Amdaquine, Amobin, Camoquin, others
- AHFS/Drugs.com: International Drug Names
- ATC code: P01BA06 (WHO)

Identifiers
- IUPAC name: 4-[(7-chloroquinolin-4-yl)amino]-2-[(diethylamino)methyl]phenol
- CAS Number: 86-42-0
- PubChem CID: 2165
- DrugBank: DB00613
- ChemSpider: 2080
- UNII: 220236ED28
- KEGG: D02922
- ChEBI: CHEBI:2674
- ChEMBL: ChEMBL682
- CompTox Dashboard (EPA): DTXSID2022597
- ECHA InfoCard: 100.001.518

Chemical and physical data
- Formula: C_{20}H_{22}ClN_{3}O
- Molar mass: 355.87 g·mol^{−1}
- 3D model (JSmol): Interactive image
- SMILES: Clc1cc2nccc(c2cc1)Nc3cc(c(O)cc3)CN(CC)CC
- InChI: InChI=1S/C20H22ClN3O/c1-3-24(4-2)13-14-11-16(6-8-20(14)25)23-18-9-10-22-19-12-15(21)5-7-17(18)19/h5-12,25H,3-4,13H2,1-2H3,(H,22,23); Key:OVCDSSHSILBFBN-UHFFFAOYSA-N

Amodiaquine (ADQ) is a medication used to treat malaria, including Plasmodium falciparum malaria when uncomplicated. It is recommended to be given with artesunate to reduce the risk of resistance. Due to the risk of rare but serious side effects, it is not generally recommended to prevent malaria. Though, the World Health Organization (WHO) in 2013 recommended use for seasonal preventive in children at high risk in combination with sulfadoxine and pyrimethamine.

Amodiaquine is a 4-aminoquinoline compound related to chloroquine. The side effects of amodiaquine are generally minor to moderate and are similar to those of chloroquine. Rarely liver problems or low blood cell levels may occur. When taken in excess headaches, trouble seeing, seizures, and cardiac arrest may occur. The WHO recommends its use for pregnant women during the second and third trimester as well as during lactation, but reports that evidence for use in the first trimester is still insufficient.

Amodiaquine was first made in 1948. It is on the World Health Organization's List of Essential Medicines. While not available in the United States, it is widely available in Africa.

== Medical uses ==
Amodiaquine has become an important drug in the combination therapy for malaria treatment in Africa. It is often used in combination with artesunate as a by mouth artemisinin-based combination therapy (ACT) for uncomplicated P. falciparum malaria. Amodiaquine has also been found to work against chloroquine-resistant P. falciparum strains of malaria, though there is geographic variation in its activity against chloroquine-resistant strains.

It is also used in combination with sulfadoxine/pyrimethamine.

== Interactions ==
There have been reports of increased liver toxicity in people with HIV/AIDS on zidovudine or efavirenz when treated with amodiaquine-containing ACT regimens, therefore it is recommended that these people avoid amodiaquine.

== Pharmacokinetics and pharmacogenetics ==
It is bioactivated hepatically to its primary metabolite, N-desethylamodiaquine, by the cytochrome p450 enzyme CYP2C8. Among amodiaquine users, several rare but serious side effects have been reported and linked to variants in the CYP2C8 alleles. CYP2C8*1 is characterized as the wild-type allele, which shows an acceptable safety profile, while CYP2C8*2, *3 and *4 all show a range of "poor metabolizer" phenotypes. People who are poor metabolizers of amodiaquine display lower treatment efficacy against malaria, as well as increased toxicity. Several studies have been conducted to determine the prevalence of CYP2C8 alleles amongst malaria patients in East Africa, and have tentatively shown the variant alleles have significant prevalence in that population. About 3.6% of the population studied showed high risk for a poor reaction to or reduced treatment outcomes when treated with amodiaquine. This information is useful in developing programs of pharmacovigilance in East Africa, and have important clinical considerations for prescribing antimalarial medications in regions with high CYP2C8 variant frequency.

== See also ==
- Structurally similar is FGI-104
