= Artesunate/amodiaquine =

Malaria drug

Combination of
- Artesunate: Antimalarial
- Amodiaquine: Antimalarial

Clinical data
- Trade names: Camoquin, others
- Other names: ASAQ
- ATC code: P01BF03 (WHO)

Identifiers
- CAS Number: 88495-63-0; 86-42-0
- ChemSpider: none
- UNII: 60W3249T9M; 220236ED28

Artesunate/amodiaquine, sold under the trade name Camoquin among others, is a medication used for the treatment of malaria. It is a fixed-dose combination of artesunate and amodiaquine. Specifically it recommended for acute uncomplicated Plasmodium falciparum malaria. It is taken by mouth.

Common side effects include loss of appetite, nausea, abdominal pain, sleepiness, trouble sleeping, and cough. Safety in pregnancy is not clear; however, the medication may be used if others are not possible. It is believed to be safe for use during breastfeeding. Artesunate and amodiaquine are both antimalarial medication; however, work by different mechanisms.

Artesunate/amodiaquine was commercially launched in 2007. It is on the World Health Organization's List of Essential Medicines. Artesunate/amodiaquine is available as a generic medication. As of 2014 it is not commercially available in the United States or United Kingdom.

== Medical uses ==
Early clinical trials showed that a once-a-day dosage was effective. It was subsequently clinically shown to be equally effective as artemether/lumefantrine, although it is likely to be more effective in the field due to its simpler once-a-day dosage compared to artemether/lumefantrine twice-per-day dosage.

== Society and culture ==
Artesunate/amodiaquine was commercially launched in 2007 as an affordable treatment for malaria, devised by DNDi in partnership with Sanofi-Aventis. ASAQ was handed over to the MMV Access and Product Management Team in May 2015.
