= Quinidine =

Antiarrythmic medication

Clinical data
- Trade names: Quinaglute, Quinidex
- Other names: (2-Ethenyl-4-azabicyclo[2.2.2]oct-5-yl)-(6-methoxyquinolin-4-yl)-methanol
- AHFS/Drugs.com: Monograph
- Pregnancy category: AU: C
- Routes of administration: By mouth, intramuscular injection, intravenous
- ATC code: C01BA01 (WHO)

Legal status
- Legal status: AU: S4 (Prescription only); CA: ℞-only; UK: POM (Prescription only); US: ℞-only

Pharmacokinetic data
- Bioavailability: 70–85%
- Metabolism: 50–90% (by liver)
- Elimination half-life: 6–8 hours
- Excretion: By the liver (20% as unchanged quinidine via urine)

Identifiers
- IUPAC name: (S)-(6-Methoxyquinolin-4-yl)[(1S,2R,4S,5R)-5-vinylquinuclidin-2-yl]methanol
- CAS Number: 56-54-2
- PubChem CID: 441074
- IUPHAR/BPS: 2342
- DrugBank: DB00908
- ChemSpider: 389880
- UNII: ITX08688JL
- KEGG: D08458
- ChEBI: CHEBI:28593
- ChEMBL: ChEMBL97
- CompTox Dashboard (EPA): DTXSID4023549
- ECHA InfoCard: 100.000.254

Chemical and physical data
- Formula: C_{20}H_{24}N_{2}O_{2}
- Molar mass: 324.424 g·mol^{−1}
- 3D model (JSmol): Interactive image
- SMILES: O(c4cc1c(nccc1[C@H](O)[C@@H]2N3CC[C@@H](C2)[C@@H](/C=C)C3)cc4)C
- InChI: InChI=1S/C20H24N2O2/c1-3-13-12-22-9-7-14(13)10-19(22)20(23)16-6-8-21-18-5-4-15(24-2)11-17(16)18/h3-6,8,11,13-14,19-20,23H,1,7,9-10,12H2,2H3/t13-,14-,19+,20-/m0/s1; Key:LOUPRKONTZGTKE-LHHVKLHASA-N

Quinidine is a class IA antiarrhythmic agent used to treat heart rhythm disturbances. It is a diastereomer of antimalarial agent quinine, originally derived from the bark of the cinchona tree. The drug causes increased action potential duration, as well as a prolonged QT interval. As of 2019, its IV formulation is no longer being manufactured for use in the United States.

== Medical uses ==
Quinidine is occasionally used as a class I antiarrhythmic agent to prevent ventricular arrhythmias, particularly in Brugada Syndrome, although its safety in this indication is uncertain.

It reduces the recurrence of atrial fibrillation after patients undergo cardioversion, but it has proarrhythmic effects and trials suggest that it may lead to an overall increased mortality in these patients.

Quinidine is also used to treat short QT syndrome.

Eli Lilly has discontinued manufacture of parenteral quinidine gluconate in the US, and its future availability in many countries is uncertain.

=== Other uses ===
There is one study supporting the use of a novel combination of dextromethorphan and low dose quinidine in alleviating symptoms of easy laughing and crying (pseudobulbar affect); these are a type of rather severe uncontrollable behaviors which can be present in various neurological pathologies such as amyotrophic lateral sclerosis and multiple sclerosis. The dose of quinidine (10 mg two times daily) is about 1/40th of a relatively low antiarrhythmic dose (400 mg, twice or 3 times daily, as an example; antiarrhythmic doses can sometimes exceed 1500 mg/day). The authors did not observe significant safety risks using the low quinidine dose, but urged caution and also pointed out that quinidine interacts with a large number of other medications in dangerous or unpredictable ways. A meta analysis was published referencing only that one study.

Although intravenous quinidine is sometimes used to treat Plasmodium falciparum malaria, the future availability of this agent is uncertain.

== Side effects ==
Quinidine is an inhibitor of the cytochrome P450 enzyme 2D6, and can lead to increased blood levels of lidocaine, beta blockers, opioids, and some antidepressants. Quinidine also inhibits the transport protein P-glycoprotein and so can cause some peripherally acting drugs such as loperamide to have central nervous system side effects, such as respiratory depression, if the two drugs are coadministered.

Quinidine can cause thrombocytopenia, granulomatous hepatitis, myasthenia gravis, and torsades de pointes (dangerous heart rhythm), and has been largely phased out in favor of other antiarrhythmics. Torsades can occur after the first dose. Quinidine-induced thrombocytopenia (low platelet count) is mediated by the immune system, and may lead to thrombocytic purpura.

Quinidine intoxication can lead to a collection of symptoms collectively known as cinchonism, with tinnitus (ringing in the ears) being among the most characteristic and common symptoms of this toxicity syndrome.

== Pharmacology ==
=== Pharmacodynamics ===
Quinidine acts as a blocker of voltage-gated sodium channels. Inhibition of the Na_{v}1.5 channel is specifically involved in its antiarrhythmic effects as a class I antiarrhythmic agent. Quinidine also blocks certain voltage-gated potassium channels (e.g., K_{v}1.4, K_{v}4.2, hERG, among others), acts as an antimuscarinic and alpha-1 blocker, and is an antimalarial. It is said to be a selective muscarinic acetylcholine M_{3} receptor antagonist.

==== Mechanism of action ====
Like all other class I antiarrhythmic agents, quinidine primarily works by blocking the fast inward sodium current (I_{Na}). Quinidine's effect on I_{Na} is known as a 'use dependent block'. This means at higher heart rates, the block increases, while at lower heart rates, the block decreases. The effect of blocking the fast inward sodium current causes the phase 0 depolarization of the cardiac action potential to decrease (decreased V_{max}).

It seems still efficacious as an IV antimalarial against Plasmodium falciparum. This electrolyte dependent agent also increases action potentials and prolongs the QT interval. Quinidine also blocks the slowly inactivating, tetrodotoxin-sensitive Na current, the slow inward calcium current (I_{Ca}), the rapid (I_{Kr}) and slow (I_{Ks}) components of the delayed potassium rectifier current, the inward potassium rectifier current (I_{KI}), the ATP-sensitive potassium channel (I_{K_{ATP}}) and I_{to}.

At micromolar concentrations, quinidine inhibits Na^{+}/K^{+}-ATPase by binding to the same receptor sites as the digitalis glycosides such as ouabain.

The effect of quinidine on the ion channels is to prolong the cardiac action potential, thereby prolonging the QT interval on the surface ECG.

Other ECG effects include a wide notched P wave, wide QRS complex, depressed ST segment, and U waves. These are the results of both slowed depolarization and repolarization.

=== Pharmacokinetics ===
==== Elimination ====
The elimination half-life of oral quinidine ranges between 3 to 19 hours, and it is eliminated by the cytochrome P450 system in the liver. Roughly 15% to 40% is excreted unchanged via the kidneys.

== History ==
The effects of cinchona bark (the botanical source from which quinidine is extracted) had been commented on long before the understanding of cardiac physiology arose. Jean-Baptiste de Sénac, in his 1749 work on the anatomy, function, and diseases of the heart, had this to say:

"Long and rebellious palpitations have ceded to this febrifuge".

"Of all the stomachic remedies, the one whose effects have appeared to me the most constant and the most prompt in many cases is quinquina [Peruvian bark] mixed with a little rhubarb."

Sénac subsequently became physician to Louis XV of France, a counselor of the state, and superintendent of the mineral waters and medicinals in France. As a result of his influence, throughout the 19th century, quinidine was used to augment digitalis therapy. It was described as das Opium des Herzens (the opium of the heart).

However, the use of quinidine to treat arrhythmia really only came into its own because a physician listened to the astute observation of one of his patients. In 1912, Karel Frederik Wenckebach saw a man with atrial fibrillation. He was a Dutch merchant, used to good order in his affairs. He would like to have good order in his heart business, also, and asked, "why there were heart specialists if they could not abolish this very disagreeable phenomenon ... he knew himself how to get rid of his attacks. As I did not believe him, he promised to come back next morning with a regular pulse, and he did."

The man had found by chance that when he took one gram of quinine during an attack, it reliably halted it in 25 minutes; otherwise it would last for two to 14 days. Wenckebach often tried quinine again, but he succeeded in only one other patient.

He made passing mention of it in his book on cardiac arrhythmias published in 1914. Four years later, Walter von Frey of Berlin reported in a leading Viennese medical journal that quinidine was the most effective of the four principal cinchona alkaloids in controlling atrial arrhythmias.

== Chemistry ==
Quinidine-based ligands are used in AD-mix-β for Sharpless asymmetric dihydroxylation.

== Veterinary use ==
Quinidine sulfate is used in the treatment of atrial fibrillation in horses.
