= Cinchonism =

- Other names: Quinine toxicity
- Specialty: Emergency medicine

Cinchonism is a pathological condition caused by an overdose of quinine or its natural source, cinchona bark. Quinine and its derivatives are used medically to treat malaria and lupus erythematosus. In much smaller amounts, quinine is an ingredient of tonic drinks, acting as a bittering agent. Cinchonism can occur from therapeutic doses of quinine, either from one or several large doses. Quinidine (a Class 1A anti-arrhythmic) can also cause cinchonism symptoms to develop with as little as a single dose.

== Signs and symptoms ==
Signs and symptoms of mild cinchonism (which may occur from standard therapeutic doses of quinine) include flushed and sweaty skin, ringing of the ears (tinnitus), blurred vision, impaired hearing, confusion, reversible high-frequency hearing loss, headache, abdominal pain, rashes, drug-induced lichenoid reaction (lichenoid photosensitivity), vertigo, dizziness, nausea, vomiting and diarrhea.

Large doses of quinine may lead to severe (but reversible) symptoms of cinchonism: skin rashes, deafness, somnolence, diminished visual acuity or blindness, anaphylactic shock, and disturbances in heart rhythm or conduction, and death from cardiotoxicity (damage to the heart). Quinine may also trigger a rare form of hypersensitivity reaction in malaria patients, termed blackwater fever, that results in massive hemolysis, hemoglobinemia, hemoglobinuria, and kidney failure. Most symptoms of cinchonism (except in severe cases) are reversible and disappear once quinine is withdrawn. Attempted suicide by intake of a large dose of quinine has caused irreversible tunnel vision and very severe visual impairment.

Patients treated with quinine may also suffer from low blood sugar, especially if it is administered intravenously, and hypotension (low blood pressure).

Quinine, like chloroquine, inactivates enzymes in the lysosomes of cells and has an anti-inflammatory effect, hence its use in the treatment of rheumatoid arthritis. However, inactivation of these enzymes can also cause abnormal accumulation of glycogen and phospholipids in lysosomes, causing toxic myopathy. It is possible this action is the root cause of cinchonism.
