= 4-Aminoquinoline =

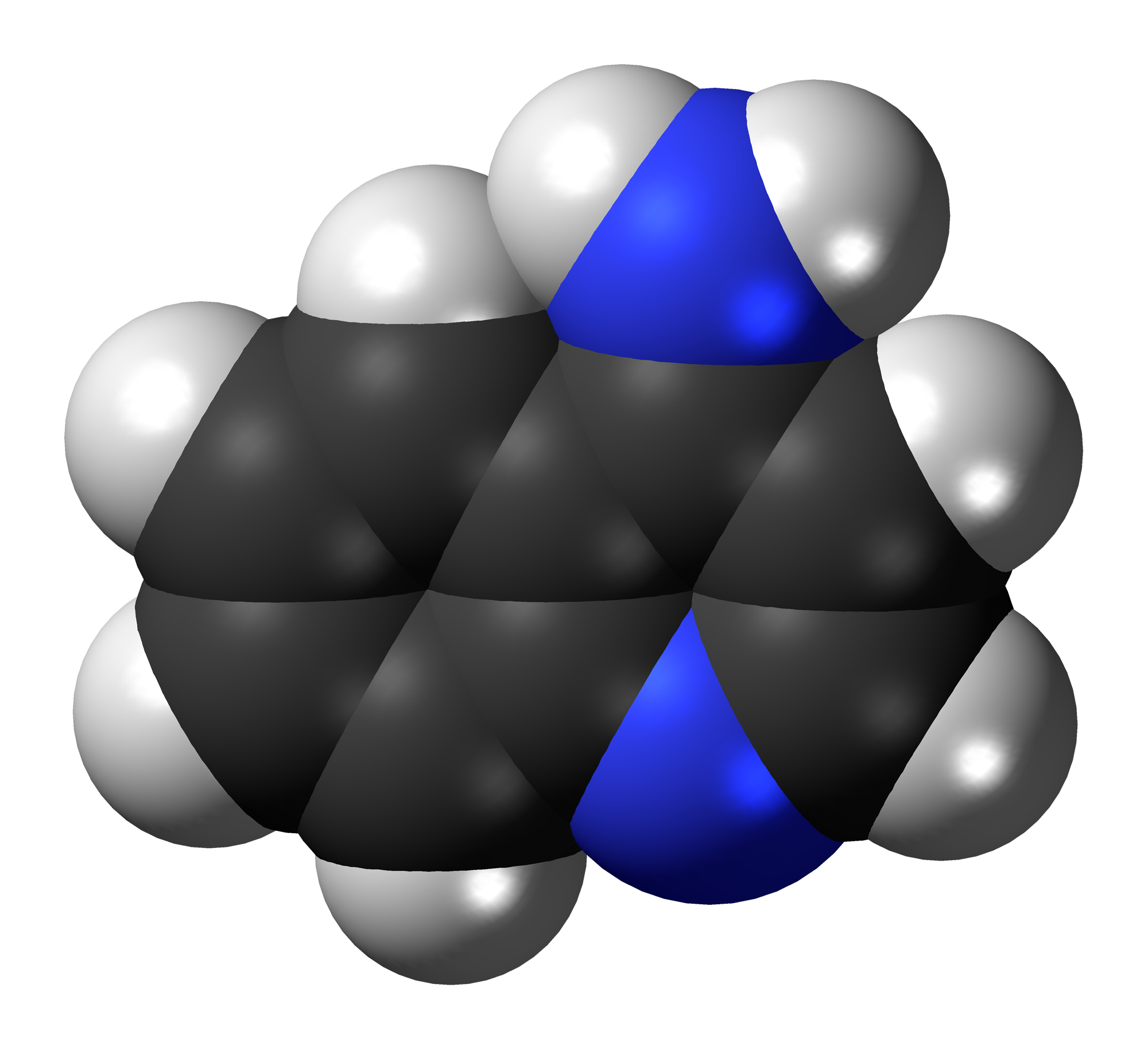

Names
- Preferred IUPAC name Quinolin-4-amine

Identifiers
CAS Number	578-68-7
3D model (JSmol)	Interactive image
ChEMBL	ChEMBL58146
ChemSpider	61751
ECHA InfoCard	100.167.771
PubChem CID	68476
UNII	GTE5P5L97N
CompTox Dashboard (EPA)	DTXSID70206491
- InChI: InChI=1S/C9H8N2/c10-8-5-6-11-9-4-2-1-3-7(8)9/h1-6H,(H2,10,11) Key: FQYRLEXKXQRZDH-UHFFFAOYSA-N
- SMILES: n1ccc(c2ccccc12)N

Properties
Chemical formula	C_{9}H_{8}N_{2}
Molar mass	144.177 g·mol^{−1}
Appearance	Powder to crystalline, White/Yellow/Orange
Melting point	151–155 °C (304–311 °F; 424–428 K)

Hazards
- Occupational safety and health (OHS/OSH)
Main hazards	Causes skin and serious eye irritation
- Except where otherwise noted, data are given for materials in their standard state (at 25 °C [77 °F], 100 kPa). verify (what is ?) Infobox references

4-Aminoquinoline is a form of aminoquinoline with the amino group at the 4-position of the quinoline. The compound has been used as a precursor for the synthesis of its derivatives.

A variety of derivatives of 4-aminoquinoline are antimalarial agents useful in treating erythrocytic plasmodial infections. Examples include amodiaquine, chloroquine, and hydroxychloroquine. Other uses for the derivatives are: anti-asthmatic, antibacterial, anti-fungal, anti-malarial, antiviral and anti-inflammatory agents.

A patent application for 4-aminoquinoline compounds was filed in 2002 and published in 2005.

Amodiaquine

Chloroquine

Hydroxychloroquine

== See also ==
- Quinoline
- 8-Hydroxyquinoline
- Ionophore
