= Quinine =

Medication used to treat malaria and babesiosis

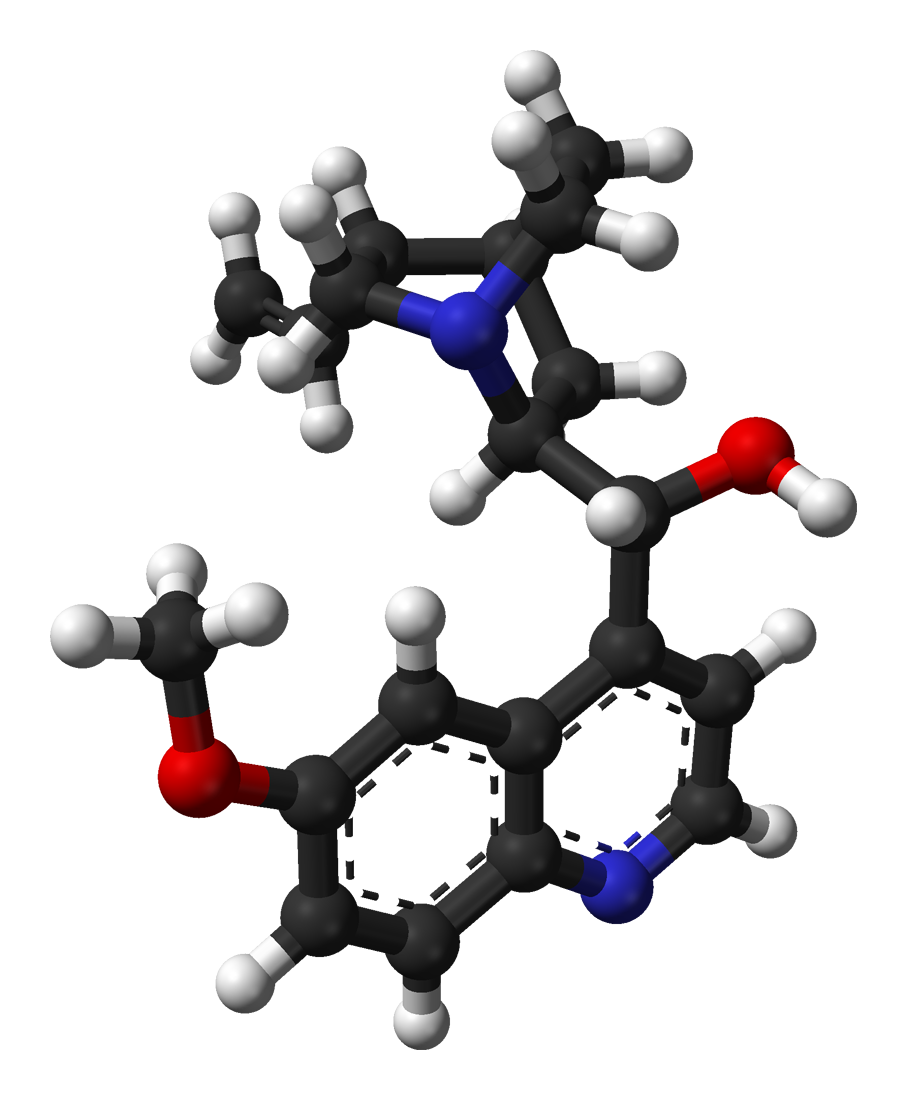

Clinical data
- Pronunciation: US: /ˈkwaɪnaɪn/, /kwɪˈniːn/ or UK: /ˈkwɪniːn/ KWIN-een
- Trade names: Qualaquin, Quinbisul, others
- AHFS/Drugs.com: Monograph
- MedlinePlus: a682322
- License data: US DailyMed: Quinine; US FDA: Quinine
- Pregnancy category: AU: D
- Routes of administration: By mouth, intramuscular, intravenous, rectal
- ATC code: M09AA01 (WHO) P01BC01 (WHO)

Legal status
- Legal status: AU: S4 (Prescription only); CA: ℞-only; UK: POM (Prescription only); US: ℞-only

Pharmacokinetic data
- Protein binding: 70–95%
- Metabolism: Liver (mostly CYP3A4 and CYP2C19-mediated)
- Elimination half-life: 8–14 hours (adults), 6–12 hours (children)
- Excretion: Kidney (20%)

Identifiers
- IUPAC name: (R)-(6-Methoxyquinolin-4-yl)[(1S,2S,4S,5R)-5-vinylquinuclidin-2-yl]methanol
- CAS Number: 130-95-0
- PubChem CID: 8549
- IUPHAR/BPS: 2510
- DrugBank: DB00468
- ChemSpider: 84989
- UNII: A7V27PHC7A
- KEGG: D08460
- ChEBI: CHEBI:15854
- ChEMBL: ChEMBL170
- CompTox Dashboard (EPA): DTXSID0044280
- ECHA InfoCard: 100.004.550

Chemical and physical data
- Formula: C_{20}H_{24}N_{2}O_{2}
- Molar mass: 324.424 g·mol^{−1}
- 3D model (JSmol): Interactive image
- Melting point: 177 °C (351 °F)
- SMILES: [H][C@@]1([C@@H](C2=CC=NC3=CC=C(C=C23)OC)O)C[C@@H]4CC[N@]1C[C@@H]4C=C
- InChI: InChI=1S/C20H24N2O2/c1-3-13-12-22-9-7-14(13)10-19(22)20(23)16-6-8-21-18-5-4-15(24-2)11-17(16)18/h3-6,8,11,13-14,19-20,23H,1,7,9-10,12H2,2H3/t13-,14-,19-,20+/m0/s1; Key:LOUPRKONTZGTKE-WZBLMQSHSA-N

Quinine is an alkaloid used medically to treat malaria and babesiosis. This includes the treatment of malaria due to Plasmodium falciparum that is resistant to chloroquine when artesunate is not available. While sometimes used for nocturnal leg cramps, quinine is not recommended for this purpose due to the risk of serious side effects. It can be taken by mouth or intravenously. Malaria resistance to quinine occurs in certain areas of the world. Quinine is also used as an ingredient in tonic water and other beverages to impart a bitter taste.

Common side effects include headache, ringing in the ears, vision issues, and sweating. More severe side effects include deafness, low blood platelets, and an irregular heartbeat. Use can make one more prone to sunburn. While it is unclear if use during pregnancy carries potential for fetal harm, treating malaria during pregnancy with quinine when appropriate is still recommended. Quinine possesses a C_{9}H_{7}N quinoline functional group (pyridine fused to benzene).

Quinine was first isolated in 1820 from the bark of a cinchona tree, which is native to Peru, and its molecular formula was determined by Adolph Strecker in 1854. The class of chemical compounds to which it belongs is thus called the cinchona alkaloids. Bark extracts had been used to treat malaria since at least 1632 and it was introduced to Spain as early as 1636 by Jesuit missionaries returning from the New World. It is on the World Health Organization's List of Essential Medicines. Treatment of malaria with quinine marks the first known use of a chemical compound to treat an infectious disease.

== Uses ==
=== Medical ===
As of 2006, quinine is no longer recommended by the World Health Organization (WHO) as a first-line treatment for malaria, because there are other substances that are equally effective with fewer side effects. They recommend that it be used only when artemisinins are not available. Quinine is also used to treat lupus and arthritis.

Quinine was frequently prescribed as an off-label treatment for leg cramps at night, but this has become less common since 2010 due to a warning from the US Food and Drug Administration (FDA) that such practice is associated with life-threatening side effects. Quinine can also act as a competitive inhibitor of monoamine oxidase (MAO), an enzyme that removes neurotransmitters from the brain. As an MAO inhibitor, it has potential to serve as a treatment for individuals with psychological disorders, similar to antidepressants that inhibit MAO.

==== Available forms ====
Quinine is a basic amine and is usually provided as a salt. Various existing preparations include the hydrochloride, dihydrochloride, sulfate, bisulfate and gluconate. In the United States, quinine sulfate is commercially available in 324 mg tablets under the brand name Qualaquin.

All quinine salts may be given orally or intravenously (IV); quinine gluconate may also be given intramuscularly (IM) or rectally (PR). The main problem with rectal administration is that the dose can be expelled before it is completely absorbed; in practice, this is corrected by giving a further half dose. No injectable preparation of quinine is licensed in the US; quinidine is used instead.

Quinine base in various salts
Name	Amount equivalent to 100 mg quinine base
Quinine base	100 mg
Quinine bisulfate	169 mg
Quinine dihydrochloride	122 mg
Quinine gluconate	160 mg
Quinine hydrochloride	111 mg
Quinine sulfate dihydrate [(quinine)_{2}H_{2}SO_{4}∙2H_{2}O]	121 mg

=== Beverages ===
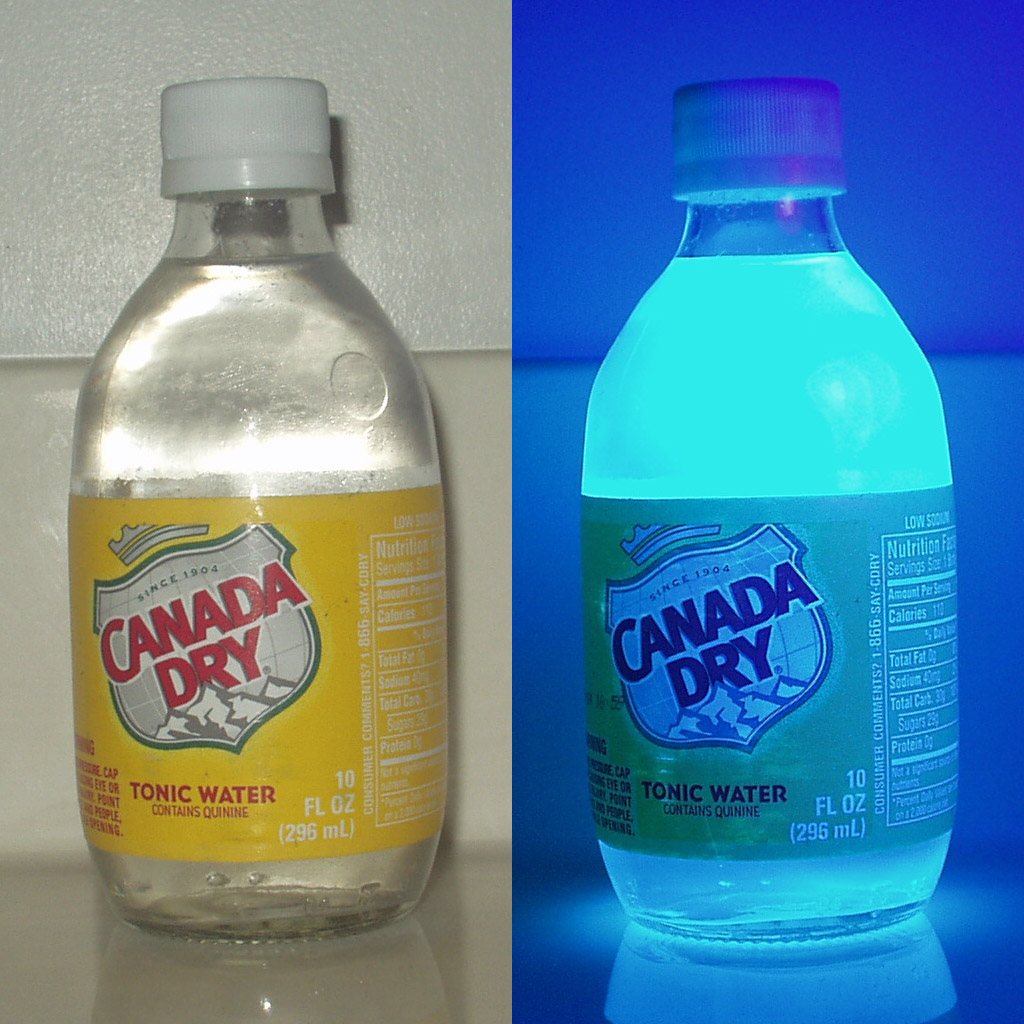
Tonic water, in normal light and ultraviolet "black light". The quinine content of tonic water causes it to fluoresce under black light.

Quinine is a flavor component of tonic water and bitter lemon soft drinks. On the soda gun behind many bars, tonic water is designated by the letter "Q" representing quinine.

Tonic water was initially marketed as a means of delivering quinine to consumers in order to offer anti-malarial protection. According to tradition, because of the bitter taste of anti-malarial quinine tonic, British colonials in India mixed it with gin to make it more palatable, thus creating the gin and tonic cocktail, which is still popular today. While it is possible to drink enough tonic water to temporarily achieve quinine levels that offer anti-malarial protection, it is not a sustainable long-term means of protection.

In France, quinine is an ingredient of an apéritif known as quinquina, or "Cap Corse", and the wine-based apéritif Dubonnet. In Spain, quinine (also known as "Peruvian bark" for its origin from the native cinchona tree) is sometimes blended into sweet Malaga wine, which is then called "Malaga Quina". In Italy, the traditional flavoured wine Barolo Chinato is infused with quinine and local herbs, and is served as a digestif. In Britain, the company A.G. Barr uses quinine as an ingredient in the carbonated and caffeinated beverage Irn-Bru. In Uruguay and Argentina, quinine is an ingredient of a PepsiCo tonic water named Paso de los Toros. In Denmark, it is used as an ingredient in the carbonated sports drink Faxe Kondi made by Royal Unibrew.

As a flavouring agent in drinks, quinine is limited to 83 ppm (83 mg/L) in the United States, to 85 mg/L in Taiwan, and to 100 mg/L in the European Union.

Direct use of cinchona bark in beverages is also allowed in the US, with a maximum allowed total cinchona alkaloid level of 83 ppm in the finished beverage.

=== Scientific ===
Quinine (and quinidine) are used as the chiral moiety for the ligands used in Sharpless asymmetric dihydroxylation as well as for numerous other chiral catalyst backbones. Because of its relatively constant and well-known fluorescence quantum yield, quinine is used in photochemistry as a common fluorescence standard.

== Contraindications ==
Because of the narrow difference between its therapeutic and toxic effects, quinine is a common cause of drug-induced disorders, including thrombocytopenia and thrombotic microangiopathy. Even from minor levels occurring in common beverages, quinine can have severe adverse effects involving multiple organ systems, among which are immune system effects and fever, hypotension, hemolytic anemia, acute kidney injury, liver toxicity, and blindness. In people with atrial fibrillation, conduction defects, or heart block, quinine can cause heart arrhythmias, and should be avoided.

Quinine can cause hemolysis in G6PD deficiency (an inherited deficiency), but this risk is small and the physician should not hesitate to use quinine in people with G6PD deficiency when there is no alternative.

While not necessarily an absolute contraindication, concomitant administration of quinine with drugs primarily metabolized by CYP2D6 may lead to higher than expected plasma concentrations of the drug, due to quinine's strong inhibition of the enzyme.

== Adverse effects ==
Quinine can cause unpredictable serious and life-threatening blood and cardiovascular reactions including low platelet count and hemolytic–uremic syndrome/thrombotic thrombocytopenic purpura (HUS/TTP), long QT syndrome and other serious cardiac arrhythmias including torsades de pointes, blackwater fever, disseminated intravascular coagulation, leukopenia, and neutropenia. Some people who have developed TTP due to quinine have gone on to develop kidney failure. It can also cause serious hypersensitivity reactions including anaphylactic shock, urticaria, serious skin rashes, including Stevens–Johnson syndrome and toxic epidermal necrolysis, angioedema, facial edema, bronchospasm, granulomatous hepatitis, and itchiness.

The most common adverse effects involve a group of symptoms called cinchonism, which can include headache, vasodilation and sweating, nausea, tinnitus, hearing impairment, vertigo or dizziness, blurred vision, and disturbance in color perception. More severe cinchonism includes vomiting, diarrhea, abdominal pain, deafness, blindness, and disturbances in heart rhythms. Cinchonism is much less common when quinine is given by mouth, but oral quinine is not well tolerated (quinine is exceedingly bitter and many people will vomit after ingesting quinine tablets). Other drugs, such as Fansidar (sulfadoxine with pyrimethamine) or Malarone (proguanil with atovaquone), are often used when oral therapy is required. Quinine ethyl carbonate (quinine etabonate) is tasteless and odourless, but is available commercially only in Japan. Blood glucose, electrolyte and cardiac monitoring are not necessary when quinine is given by mouth.

Quinine has diverse unwanted interactions with numerous prescription drugs, such as potentiating the anticoagulant effects of warfarin. It is a strong inhibitor of CYP2D6, an enzyme involved in the metabolism of many drugs.

== Mechanism of action ==
Quinine is used for its toxicity to the malarial pathogen, Plasmodium falciparum, by interfering with its ability to dissolve and metabolize hemoglobin. As with other quinoline antimalarial drugs, the precise mechanism of action of quinine has not been fully resolved, although in vitro studies indicate it inhibits nucleic acid and protein synthesis, and inhibits glycolysis in P. falciparum. The most widely accepted hypothesis of its action is based on the well-studied and closely related quinoline drug, chloroquine. This model involves the inhibition of hemozoin biocrystallization in the heme detoxification pathway, which facilitates the aggregation of cytotoxic heme. Free cytotoxic heme accumulates in the parasites, killing them. Quinine may target the malaria purine nucleoside phosphorylase enzyme.

== Chemistry ==
The UV absorption of quinine peaks around 350 nm (in UVA). Fluorescent emission peaks at around 460 nm (bright blue/cyan hue). Quinine is highly fluorescent (quantum yield ~0.58) in 0.1 M sulfuric acid solution.

=== Synthesis ===
Cinchona trees remain the only economically practical source of quinine. However, under wartime pressure during World War II, research towards its synthetic production was undertaken. A formal chemical synthesis was accomplished in 1944 by American chemists R.B. Woodward and W.E. Doering. Since then, several more efficient quinine total syntheses have been achieved, but none of them can compete in economic terms with isolation of the alkaloid from natural sources. The first synthetic organic dye, mauveine, was discovered by William Henry Perkin in 1856 while he was attempting to synthesize quinine.

=== Biosynthesis ===
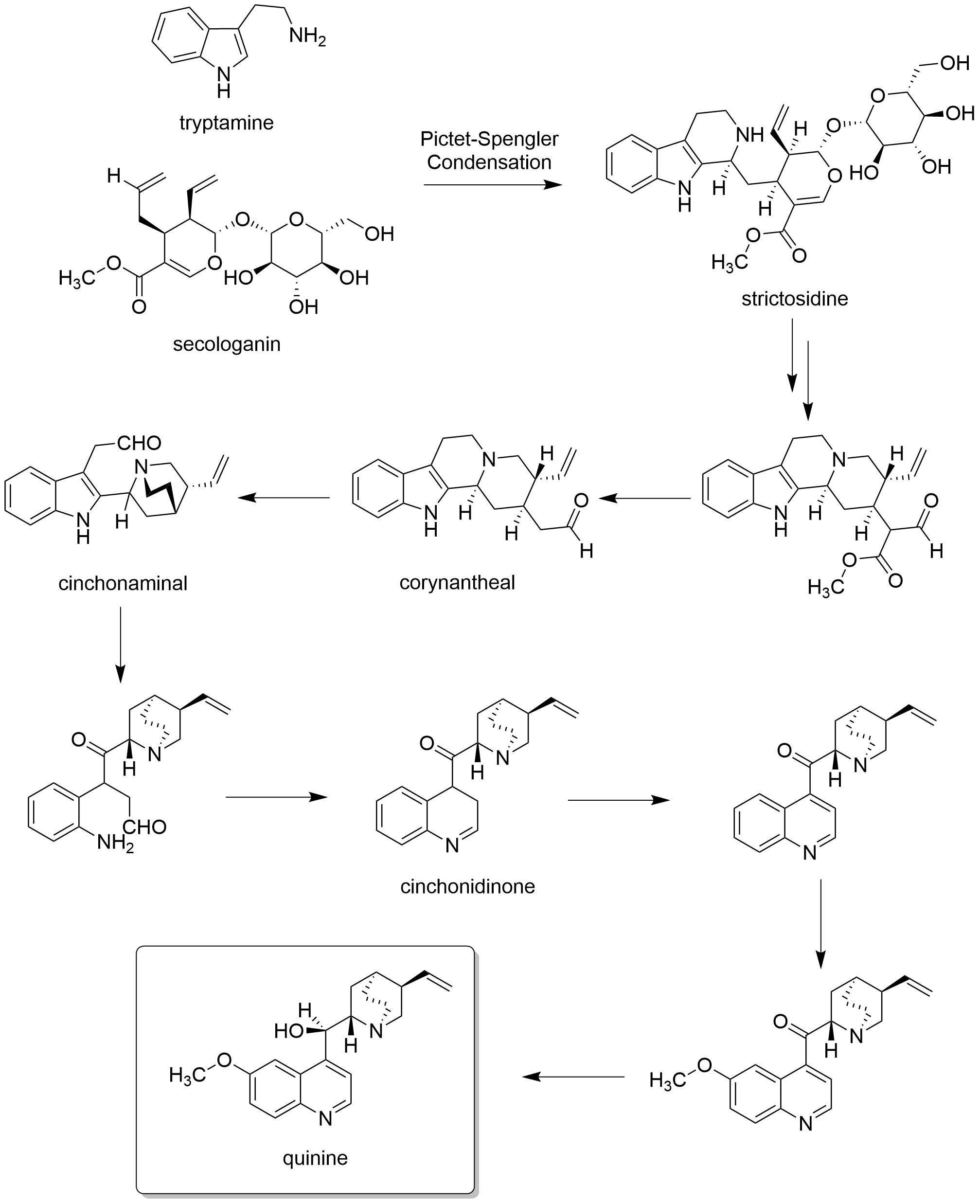
Quinine biosynthesis

In the first step of quinine biosynthesis, the enzyme strictosidine synthase catalyzes a stereoselective Pictet–Spengler reaction between tryptamine and secologanin to yield strictosidine. Suitable modification of strictosidine leads to an aldehyde. Hydrolysis and decarboxylation would initially remove one carbon from the iridoid portion and produce corynantheal. Then the tryptamine side-chain were cleaved adjacent to the nitrogen, and this nitrogen was then bonded to the acetaldehyde function to yield cinchonaminal. Ring opening in the indole heterocyclic ring could generate new amine and keto functions. The new quinoline heterocycle would then be formed by combining this amine with the aldehyde produced in the tryptamine side-chain cleavage, giving cinchonidinone. For the last step, hydroxylation and methylation gives quinine.

=== Catalysis ===
Quinine and other Cinchona alkaloids can be used as catalysts for stereoselective reactions in organic synthesis. For example, the quinine-catalyzed Michael addition of a malononitrile to α,β-enones gives a high degree of stereochemical control.

== History ==
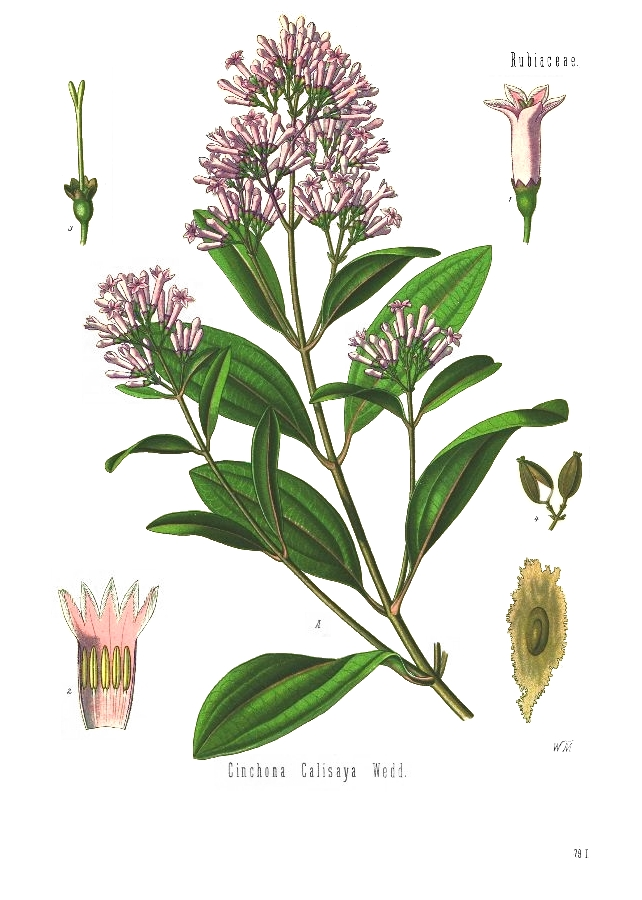
19th-century illustration of Cinchona calisaya

Quinine was used as a muscle relaxant by the Quechua peoples of Peru, Bolivia and Ecuador to halt shivering. The Quechua would mix the ground bark of cinchona trees with sweetened water to offset the bark's bitter taste, thus producing something similar to tonic water.

Spanish Jesuit missionaries were the first to bring cinchona to Europe. The Spanish had observed the Quechua's use of cinchona and were aware of its bark's medicinal properties by the 1570s: Nicolás Monardes (1571) and Juan Fragoso (1572) both described a tree, which was subsequently identified as the cinchona tree, whose bark was used to produce a drink to treat diarrhea. Quinine has been used in unextracted form by Europeans since at least the early 17th century.

A popular story of how it was brought to Europe by the Countess of Chinchon was disproven by medical historian Alec Haggis around 1941. During the 17th century, malaria was endemic to the swamps and marshes surrounding the city of Rome. It had caused the deaths of several popes, many cardinals and countless common Roman citizens. Most of the Catholic priests trained in Rome had seen malaria patients and were familiar with the shivering brought on by the febrile phase of the disease.

The Jesuit Agostino Salumbrino (1564–1642), an apothecary by training who lived in Lima (now in present-day Peru), observed the Quechua using the bark of the cinchona tree to treat such shivering. While its effect in treating malaria (and malaria-induced shivering) was unrelated to its effect in controlling shivering from rigors, it was a successful medicine against malaria. At the first opportunity, Salumbrino sent a small quantity to Rome for testing as a malaria treatment. In the years that followed, cinchona bark, known as Jesuit's bark or Peruvian bark, became one of the most valuable commodities shipped from Peru to Europe. It became popular in late 17th-century Lonon after it was used to cure King Charles II of malaria. It remained the antimalarial drug of choice until the 1940s, when other drugs took over.

The form of quinine most effective in treating malaria was found by Charles Marie de La Condamine in 1737. In 1820, French researchers Pierre Joseph Pelletier and Joseph Bienaimé Caventou first isolated quinine from the bark of a tree in the genus Cinchona – probably Cinchona pubescens – and subsequently named the substance. The name was derived from the original Quechua (Inca) word for the cinchona tree bark, quina or quina-quina, which means "bark of bark" or "holy bark". Prior to 1820, the bark was dried, ground to a fine powder, and mixed into a liquid (commonly wine) in order to be drunk. Large-scale use of quinine as a malaria prophylaxis started around 1850. In 1853 Paul Briquet published a brief history and discussion of the literature on "quinquina".

Quinine played a significant role in the colonization of Africa by Europeans. The availability of quinine for treatment had been said to be the prime reason Africa ceased to be known as the "white man's grave". A historian said, "it was quinine's efficacy that gave colonists fresh opportunities to swarm into the Gold Coast, Nigeria and other parts of west Africa".

To maintain their monopoly on cinchona bark, Peru and surrounding countries began outlawing the export of cinchona seeds and saplings in the early 19th century. In 1865, Manuel Incra Mamani collected seeds from a plant particularly high in quinine and provided them to Charles Ledger. Ledger sent them to his brother, who sold them to the Dutch government. Mamani was arrested on a seed collecting trip in 1871, and beaten so severely, likely because of providing the seeds to foreigners, that he died soon afterwards.

By the late 19th century the Dutch grew the plants in Indonesian plantations. Soon they became the main suppliers of the tree. In 1913 they set up the Kina Bureau, a cartel of cinchona producers charged with controlling price and production. By the 1930s Dutch plantations in Java were producing 22 million pounds of cinchona bark, or 97% of the world's quinine production. U.S. attempts to prosecute the Kina Bureau proved unsuccessful.

During World War II, Allied powers were cut off from their supply of quinine when Germany conquered the Netherlands, and Japan controlled the Philippines and Indonesia. The US had obtained four million cinchona seeds from the Philippines and began operating cinchona plantations in Costa Rica. Additionally, they began harvesting wild cinchona bark during the Cinchona Missions. Such supplies came too late. Tens of thousands of US troops in Africa and the South Pacific died of malaria due to the lack of quinine. Despite controlling the supply, the Japanese did not make effective use of quinine, and thousands of Japanese troops in the southwest Pacific died as a result.

Quinine remained the antimalarial drug of choice until after World War II. Since then, other drugs that have fewer side effects, such as chloroquine, have largely replaced it.

Bromo Quinine were brand name cold tablets containing quinine, manufactured by Grove Laboratories. They were first marketed in 1889 and available until at least the 1960s.

Conducting research in central Missouri, John S. Sappington independently developed an anti-malaria pill from quinine. Sappington began importing cinchona bark from Peru in 1820. In 1832, using quinine derived from the cinchona bark, Sappington developed a pill to treat a variety of fevers, such as scarlet fever, yellow fever, and influenza in addition to malaria. These illnesses were widespread in the Missouri and Mississippi valleys. He manufactured and sold "Dr. Sappington's Anti-Fever Pills" across Missouri. Demand became so great that within three years, Sappington founded a company known as Sappington and Sons to sell his pills nationwide.

== Society and culture ==
=== Natural occurrence ===
The bark of Remijia contains 0.5–2% of quinine. The bark is cheaper than bark of Cinchona. As it has an intense taste, it is used for making tonic water.

=== Regulation in the US ===
From 1969 to 1992, the US Food and Drug Administration (FDA) received 157 reports of health problems related to quinine use, including 23 which had resulted in death. In 1994, the FDA banned the marketing of over-the-counter quinine as a treatment for nocturnal leg cramps. Pfizer Pharmaceuticals had been selling the brand name Legatrin for this purpose. It is also sold as a softgel (by SmithKlineBeecham) as Q-vel. Doctors may still prescribe quinine, but the FDA has ordered firms to stop marketing unapproved drug products containing quinine. The FDA is also cautioning consumers about off-label use of quinine to treat leg cramps. Quinine is approved for treatment of malaria, but was also commonly prescribed to treat leg cramps and similar conditions. Because malaria is life-threatening, the risks associated with quinine use are considered acceptable when used to treat that condition.

Though Legatrin was banned by the FDA for the treatment of leg cramps, the drug manufacturer URL Mutual has branded a quinine-containing drug named Qualaquin. It is marketed as a treatment for malaria and is sold in the United States only by prescription. In 2004, the CDC reported only 1,347 confirmed cases of malaria in the United States.

=== Abortion ===
For much of the 20th century, women's use of an overdose of quinine to deliberately terminate a pregnancy was a relatively common abortion method in various parts of the world, including China.

=== Cutting agent ===
Quinine is sometimes detected as a cutting agent in street drugs such as cocaine and heroin.

== Other animals ==
Quinine is used as a treatment for Cryptocaryon irritans (commonly referred to as white spot, crypto or marine ich) infection of marine aquarium fish.
