= Sulfadoxine/pyrimethamine =

Combination drug

Combination of
- Sulfadoxine: Sulfonamide
- Pyrimethamine: Antiparasitic

Clinical data
- Pronunciation: peer-i-METH-a-meen/sul-fa-DOX-een
- Trade names: Fansidar, Fanlar, others
- AHFS/Drugs.com: Consumer Drug Information
- License data: US DailyMed: Pyrimethamine and sulfadoxine
- Pregnancy category: AU: C
- Routes of administration: By mouth
- ATC code: P01BD51 (WHO)

Legal status
- Legal status: AU: S4 (Prescription only); UK: POM (Prescription only); US: ℞-only

Identifiers
- CAS Number: 37338-39-9
- KEGG: D02448

Sulfadoxine/pyrimethamine, sold under the brand name Fansidar, is a combination medication used to treat malaria. It contains sulfadoxine (a sulfonamide) and pyrimethamine (an antiprotozoal). For the treatment of malaria it is typically used along with other antimalarial medication such as artesunate. In areas of Africa with moderate to high rates of malaria, three doses are recommended during the second and third trimester of pregnancy.

Side effects include diarrhea, rash, itchiness, headache, and hair loss. Rarely a severe allergic reaction or rash such as toxic epidermal necrolysis, may occur. It is not generally recommended in people with a sulfonamide allergy or significant liver or kidney disease. It works by blocking malaria's ability to use folinic acid.

Sulfadoxine/pyrimethamine was initially approved for medical use in the United States in 1981. It is on the World Health Organization's List of Essential Medicines. It is not commercially available in the United States.

== Medical uses ==
=== Malaria ===
It is approved in the United States as a treatment and preventive measure against malaria. The combination is considered to be more effective in treating malaria caused by Plasmodium falciparum than that caused by P. vivax, for which chloroquine is considered more effective, though in the absence of a species-specific diagnosis, the sulfadoxine-pyrimethamine combination may be indicated. Due to side effects, however, it is no longer recommended as a routine preventive, but only to treat serious malaria infections or to prevent them in areas where other drugs may not work. However, it is recommended by the World Health Organization (WHO) for seasonal preventative use in children when combined with amodiaquine.

=== Other ===
It has also been used as a treatment and prophylactic measure for toxoplasmosis and Pneumocystis jiroveci pneumonia.

== Adverse effects ==
Adverse effects by incidence include:

Common (>1% frequency):

- Hypersensitivity reactions (e.g. itchiness, contact dermatitis, and hives)
- Myelosuppression
- Gastrointestinal effects (e.g. nausea, vomiting, and diarrhoea)
- Headache

Rare (<1% frequency):

- Stevens–Johnson syndrome
- Toxic epidermal necrolysis
- Agranulocytosis
- Aplastic anaemia
- Disorder of haematopoietic structure
- Drug-induced eosinophilia
- Thrombocytopaenia
- Liver necrosis
- Hepatitis
- Jaundice
- Hepatomegaly
- Nephrotoxicity

Unknown frequency:

- Weight loss
- Abdominal cramps
- Hair loss
- Photosensitivity
- Fatigue
- Fever
- Polyneuritis
- Atrophic glossitis
- Gastritis
- Abnormal liver function test results (e.g. elevated serum ALT, AST, alkaline phosphatase, and bilirubin concentrations)

=== Contraindications ===
Use of this drug is contraindicated in:

- Megaloblastic anaemia caused by folate deficiency
- Hypersensitivity to pyrimethamine, sulfonamides, or any ingredient in the formulation
- Repeated prophylactic (prolonged) use in patients with kidney or liver failure or blood dyscrasias
- Infants <2 months of age
- Prophylaxis in pregnancy at term
- Prophylaxis in nursing women
- Acute porphyria

== Pharmacology ==
Sulfadoxine is a sulfonamide antibiotic that competes with p-aminobenzoic acid in the biosynthesis of folate. Pyrimethamine serves as a selective inhibitor of protozoal dihydrofolate reductase, hence preventing the synthesis of tetrahydrofolate — the active form of folate. A great degree of synergy occurs between the two drugs due to their inhibition of two different steps in the biosynthesis of tetrahydrofolate.

Pharmacokinetics
Pharmacokinetic parameter	Pyrimethamine	Sulfadoxine
Half-life	111 hours	169 hours
C_{max}	0.2 mg/L	60 mg/L
T_{max}	4 hours	4 hours
Protein bound	87%	90%
Excretion	Renal (16-30%)	Renal (30%)
Metabolism	Hepatic	Hepatic
