= Sulfadoxine =

Chemical compound

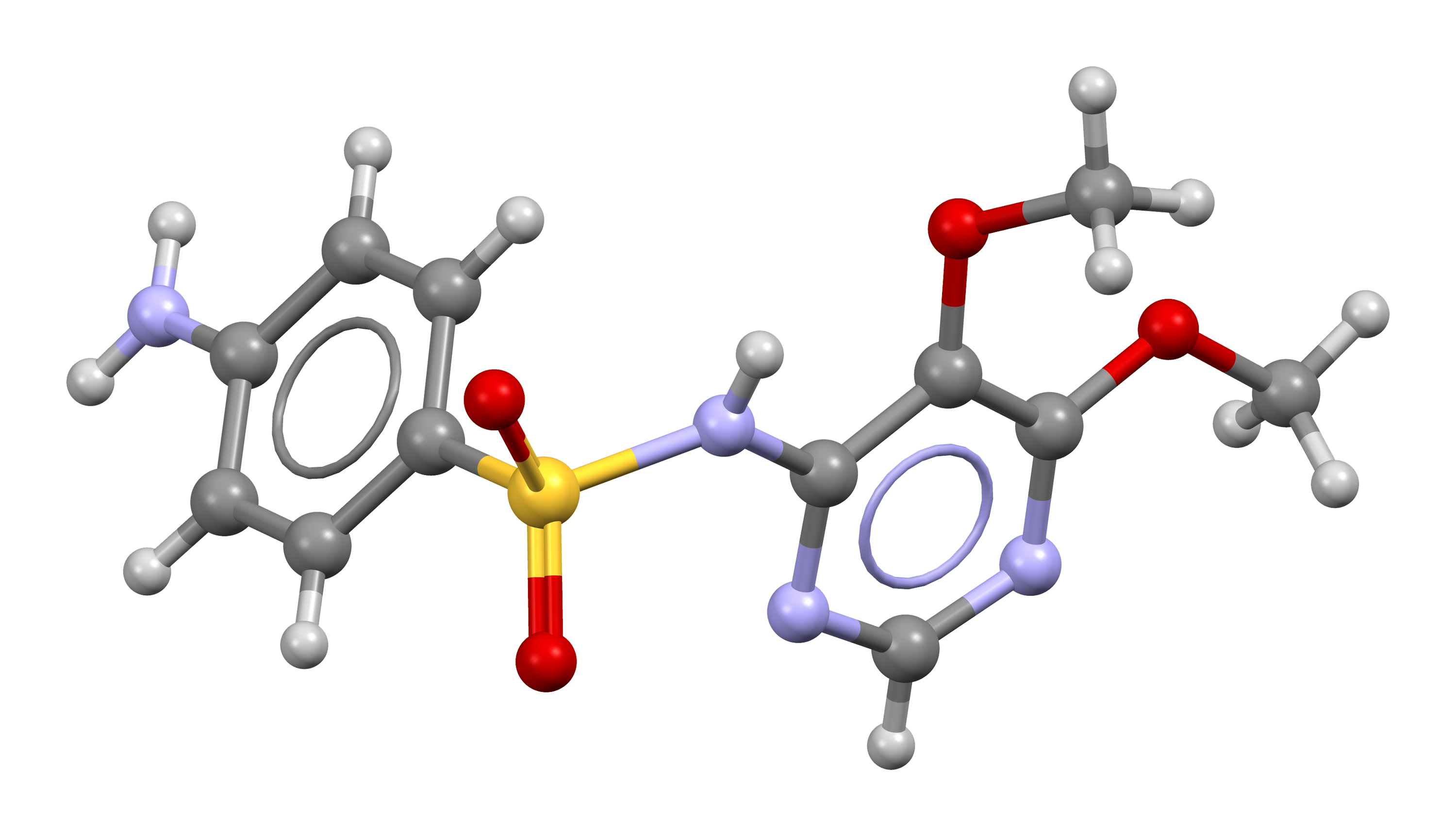

Clinical data
- AHFS/Drugs.com: International Drug Names
- ATCvet code: QJ01EQ13 (WHO)

Identifiers
- IUPAC name: 4-Amino-N-(5,6-dimethoxy-4-pyrimidinyl)benzenesulfonamide
- CAS Number: 2447-57-6
- PubChem CID: 17134
- DrugBank: DB01299
- ChemSpider: 16218
- UNII: 88463U4SM5
- KEGG: D00580
- ChEMBL: ChEMBL1539
- NIAID ChemDB: 007816
- CompTox Dashboard (EPA): DTXSID6023608
- ECHA InfoCard: 100.017.732

Chemical and physical data
- Formula: C_{12}H_{14}N_{4}O_{4}S
- Molar mass: 310.33 g·mol^{−1}
- 3D model (JSmol): Interactive image
- Melting point: 190 to 194 °C (374 to 381 °F)
- SMILES: COC1=C(N=CN=C1OC)NS(=O)(=O)C2=CC=C(C=C2)N

Sulfadoxine (also spelled sulphadoxine) is an ultra-long-lasting sulfonamide used in combination with pyrimethamine to treat malaria.

It is also used to prevent malaria but due to high levels of sulphadoxine-pyrimethamine resistance, this use has become less common.

It is also used, usually in combination with other drugs, to treat or prevent various infections in livestock.

== Mechanism of action ==
Sulfadoxine competitively inhibits dihydropteroate synthase, interfering with folate synthesis.

== See also ==
- Sulfadoxine/pyrimethamine
