= Zhou Yiqing =

Chinese professor of medicine

- 周义清
- Born: 1929 (age 96–97)
- Citizenship: People's Republic of China
- Education: PLA Second Military Medical University
- Known for: Invention of Coartem
- Awards: European Inventor Award (2009)
- Scientific career
- Fields: Medicine
- Institutions: Eighth Route Army; Institute of Microbiology and Epidemiology of the People's Liberation Army Academy of Military Medical Sciences

Zhou Yiqing (born 1929) is a professor of medicine at the Institute of Microbiology and Epidemiology of the People's Liberation Army Academy of Military Medical Sciences. He was one of the scientists who participated in the Project 523 of the Chinese Government under Chairman Mao Zedong. The project resulted in the discovery of artemisinins, a class of antimalarial drugs, from the medicinal plant Artemisia annua.

Zhou specifically worked on artemether, one of the derivatives of artemisinin. In 1985 he combined artemether with another drug lumefantrine into a single tablet, which he successfully used for the treatment of severe malaria. With the support of Novartis, the drug was produced in 1991 under the brand name Coartem, and it became the first artemisinin-based combination therapy. For this invention he and his team were awarded the European Inventor Award of 2009 in the category "Non-European countries".

== Biography ==
Zhou was a son of Chinese peasants. At age 16 he was enlisted in the Eighth Route Army of the National Revolutionary Army of China. Having a medical background he served in the healthcare of the army. He was a nurse in the beginning, then the head of a nursing squad, assistant physician and eventually doctor-in-charge during the Second Sino-Japanese War (1937–1945) and throughout the Chinese Civil War. After the civil war he studied medicine at the Second Military Medical University in Shanghai. He graduated in 1960, and then joined the Institute of Microbiology and Epidemiology of the Chinese Academy of Military Medical Sciences as a researcher.

== Development of Coartem ==
Zhou was among more than 500 Chinese scientists assigned to investigate for a new antimalarial medication during the Cultural Revolution. Established by Mao Zedong-led government in 1967, the collaborative research was called Project 523. In 1972 Tu Youyou and her team discovered artemisinin (originally known as qinghaosu). A more stable compound artemether was synthesised from artemisinin. In 1981 the National Chinese Steering Committee for Development of Qinghaosu (artemisinin) and its Derivatives authorised Zhou to work on artemether. Zhou showed that artemether combined with another antimalarial lumefantrine was the most potent of all antimalarial drugs. He worked alone for four years, and was joined by Ning Dianxi and his team in 1985. They found that in clinical trials the combined tablet (artemether/lumefantrine) had very high cure rate of severe malaria, more than 95%, including in areas where multi-drug resistance is experienced. They applied for patent in 1991, but granted only in 2002. In 1992 they got it registered as a new drug. Novartis then noticed the new drug and made a deal for mass production. In 1999 Novartis obtained the international licensing rights and gave the brand name Coartem. It was approved by the US Food and Drug Administration in 2009.
