= Project 523 =

Chinese military pharmaceutical project

Project 523 (Chinese: 523项目) was a code name for a 1967 secret military project of the People's Republic of China to find antimalarial medications. Named after the date the project launched, 23 May, it addressed malaria, an important threat in the Vietnam War. At the behest of Ho Chi Minh, Prime Minister of North Vietnam, Zhou Enlai, the Premier of the People's Republic of China, convinced Mao Zedong, Chairman of the Chinese Communist Party, to start the mass project "to keep [the] allies' troops combat-ready", as the meeting minutes put it. More than 500 Chinese scientists were recruited. The project was divided into three streams. The one for investigating traditional Chinese medicine discovered and led to the development of a class of new antimalarial drugs called artemisinins. Launched during and lasting throughout the Cultural Revolution, Project 523 was officially terminated in 1981.

For their high efficacy, safety and stability, artemisinins such as artemether and artesunate became the drugs of choice in treating falciparum malaria. The World Health Organization advocates their combination drugs and includes them in its List of Essential Medicines. Among the scientists of the project, Zhou Yiqing and his team at the Institute of Microbiology and Epidemiology of the Chinese Academy of Military Medical Sciences, were awarded the European Inventor Award of 2009 in the category "Non-European countries" for the development of Coartem (artemether-lumefantrine combination drug). Tu Youyou of the Qinghaosu Research Center, Institute of Chinese Materia Medica, Academy of Traditional Chinese Medicine (now the China Academy of Traditional Chinese Medical Sciences), received both the 2011 Lasker-DeBakey Clinical Medical Research Award and 2015 Nobel Prize in Physiology or Medicine for her role in the discovery of artemisinin.

== Background ==
The Vietnam War was fought between North Vietnam (with support from Communist countries such as Soviet Union and China) and South Vietnam (with support from the United States and its allies). The conflicts began in 1954 and became large-scale battles by 1961. Although in a better warfare position, the People's Army of Vietnam (North Vietnamese Army) and its allies in the South, Viet Cong, suffered increasing mortality because of malaria epidemics. In some battlefields, the disease would reduce military strengths by half and in severe cases, disable 90% of the troops. North Vietnamese Prime Minister Ho Chi Minh asked Chinese Premier Zhou Enlai for medical help. The year before, party Chairman Mao Zedong had introduced the Cultural Revolution, during which he would close schools and universities and banish scientists and intellectuals. Mao took Ho's plea seriously and approved a military project. On 23 May 1967, about six hundred scientists convened. These included military personnel, scientists, and medical practitioners of Western and traditional Chinese medicine. The meeting marked the start of the military-research programme, which received the code name Project 523, after the date (23 May) it launched. The project was divided into three main streams, one for developing synthetic compounds, one for clinical studies (or infection control) and another for investigating traditional Chinese medicine. Classified as a top secret state mission, the project itself saved many scientists from the atrocities of the Cultural Revolution.

== Execution and achievements ==
As the first line strategy, the troops were given synthetic drugs. Drug combinations using pyrimethamine and dapsone, pyrimethamine and sulfadoxine, and sulfadoxine and piperaquine phosphate were tested in the battlefield. Because these drugs had serious adverse effects, the primary focus was to examine traditional Chinese medicines and look for new compounds. The first drug of interest was chángshān (常山), an extract from the roots of Dichroa febrifuga depicted in the Shennong Ben Cao Jing. Another early candidate was huanghuahao (sweet wormwood or Artemisia annua). These two plants became a huge success in modern pharmacology.

=== Febrifugine from chángshān ===
The first interest was on chángshān, the root extract of Dichroa febrifuga. In the 1940s, Chinese scientists had shown that it was effective against different species of Plasmodium. American scientists isolated febrifugine as its major active antimalarial compound. The project scientists confirmed the antimalarial activity but found it unsuitable for human use due to its overwhelming potency and toxicity, outrivaling that of quinine. After the project, the compound remained under investigation, with attempts to discover suitable derivatives, among which halofuginone is an effective drug against malaria, cancer, fibrosis and inflammatory disease.

=== Discovery of artemisinin and its derivatives ===
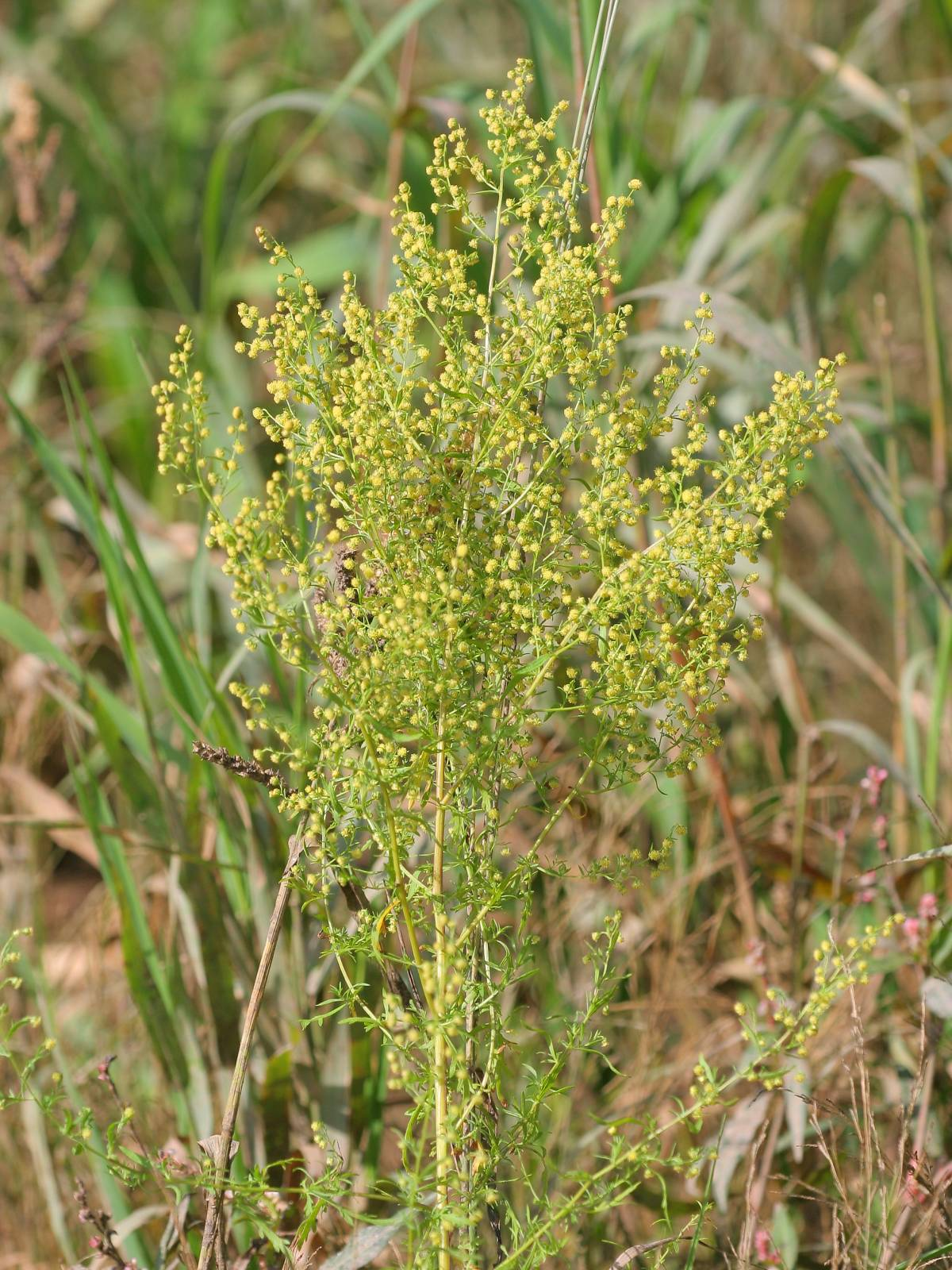
Artemisia annua, the source of the artemisinin

The fourth-century Chinese physician Ge Hong's book Zhouhou Beiji Fang (Chinese: 《肘後備急方》; lit. ''The Handbook of Prescriptions for Emergencies'') described Artemisia annua extract, called qinghao, as a treatment of malarial fever. Tu Youyou and her team were the first to investigate. In 1971 they found that their extract from the dried leaves (collected from Beijing) did not indicate any antimalarial activity. On careful reading of Ge's description they changed their extraction method of using fresh leaves under low temperature. Ge explicitly describes the recipe as: "qinghao, one bunch, take two sheng [2 × 0.2 L] of water for soaking it, wring it out, take the juice, ingest it in its entirety". Following the findings of scientists at the Yunnan Institute of Pharmacology, they found that only the fresh plant specimen collected from Sichuan province would yield the active compound. They made the purified extract into tablets, which showed very low activity. They soon realized that the compound was very insoluble and made it in capsules instead. On 4 October 1971 they successfully treated malaria in experimental mice (infected with Plasmodium berghei) and monkeys (infected with Plasmodium cynomolgi) using the new extract.

In August 1972 they reported a clinical trial in which 21 malarial patients were cured. In 1973 the Yunnan scientists and those at the Shandong Institute of Pharmacology independently obtained the antimalarial compound in a crystalline form gave the name huanghaosu or huanghuahaosu, eventually renamed qinghaosu (yet later to be popularised as "artemisinin", after the botanical name). The same year Tu synthesized the compound dihydroartemisinin from the extract. This compound was more soluble and potent than the native compound. Other scientists subsequently synthesized other artemisinin derivatives, of which the most important are artemether and artesunate. All clinical trials by this time confirmed that artemisinins are more effective than the conventional antimalarial drugs, such as chloroquine and quinine. A group of scientists in Shanghai, including chemist Wu Yulin, determined artemisinin's chemical structure in 1975 and published it in 1977 when the secrecy rules lifted. The artemisinins became the most potent as well as the safest and most rapidly acting antimalarial drugs, recommended by the World Health Organization for the treatment of different types of malaria.

=== Discovery of synthetic drugs ===
Project 523 also resulted in the discovery of synthetic drugs such as pyronaridine in 1973, lumefantrine in 1976 and naphthoquine in 1986. These are all antimalarial drugs and are still used in artemisinin-combination therapy.

== Termination and legacy ==
After Saigon fell on 30 April 1975, ending the Vietnam War, the military purpose of Project 523 subsided. Researchers could not publish their findings but could share their works within the working groups. The first publication in English (and thus circulated outside China) was in the December 1979 issue of the Chinese Medical Journal, authored simply by the Qinghaosu Antimalaria Coordinating Research Group. This attracted collaboration with the Special Programme for Research and Training in Tropical Diseases (TDR), sponsored by the United Nations Children's Fund, the United Nations Development Programme, the World Bank, and WHO, but the research remained closed to non-Chinese scientists. By the early 1980s, research had practically stopped, and the project was officially terminated in 1981. The TDR took this opportunity to organise the first international conference in Beijing on artemisinin and its variants in 1981. Supported by WHO, the Chinese Ministry of Health established the National Chinese Steering Committee for Development of Qinghaosu and its Derivatives to continue the important achievements of Project 523.

The first international collaboration was between Keith Arnold at the Roche Far East Research Foundation, Hong Kong, and Chinese researchers Jing-Bo Jiang, Xing-Bo Guo, Guo-Qiao Li, and Yun Cheung Kong. They made their first international publication in 1982 in The Lancet, in which they reported the comparative efficacy of artemisinin and mefloquine on chloroquine-resistant Plasmodium falciparum. Arnold was among those who developed mefloquine in 1979 and was planning to test the new drug in China. He and his wife Moui became the most important people in translating the historical account of the Project 523 and bringing it to international recognition. The Division of Experimental Therapeutics at the Walter Reed Army Institute of Research, under the United States Army, was the first to produce artemisinin and its derivatives outside China. Their production paved the way for commercial success.

=== Invention of Coartem ===
Artemether was more promising for clinical drug than its parent molecule artemisinin. In 1981, the National Steering Committee for Development of Qinghaosu (artemisinin) and its Derivatives authorised Zhou Yiqing, who was working at the Institute of Microbiology and Epidemiology of the Chinese Academy of Military Medical Sciences, to work on artemether. Zhou showed that artemether combined with another antimalarial lumefantrine was the most potent of all antimalarial drugs. He worked alone for four years, and Ning Dianxi and his team joined Zhou in 1985. They found that in clinical trials the combined tablet had cure rate of severe malaria of more than 95%, including in areas where multi-drug resistance is experienced. They applied for patent in 1991 but received it only in 2002. In 1992, they registered it as a new drug in China. Noticing this, Novartis signed a pact for mass production. In 1999, Novartis obtained the international licensing rights and gave the brand name Coartem. The US Food and Drug Administration approved the drug in 2009.

== See also ==
- Yunnan Baiyao
- Drug discovery
- Antimalarial medication
  - Artemisinin (major contributors: Yu Yagang (余亚纲), Gu Guoming (顾国明), Tu Youyou (屠呦呦), Luo Zeyuan (罗泽渊), Li Guoqiao (李国桥) et al., 1972)
  - Dihydroartemisinin (Tu Youyou et al., 1973)
  - Pyronaridine (1973)
  - Artemether (Li Ying (李英), 1975)
  - Lumefantrine (1976)
  - Artesunate (Li Guoqiao (李国桥), 1977)
  - Artemether/lumefantrine (Zhou Yiqing (周义清), 1985)
  - Naphthoquine (1986)
- History of science and technology in the People's Republic of China
- List of Chinese discoveries and List of Chinese inventions
- Chinese herbology and Traditional Chinese medicine
