= Tu Youyou =

Chinese pharmaceutical chemist (born 1930)

- 屠呦呦
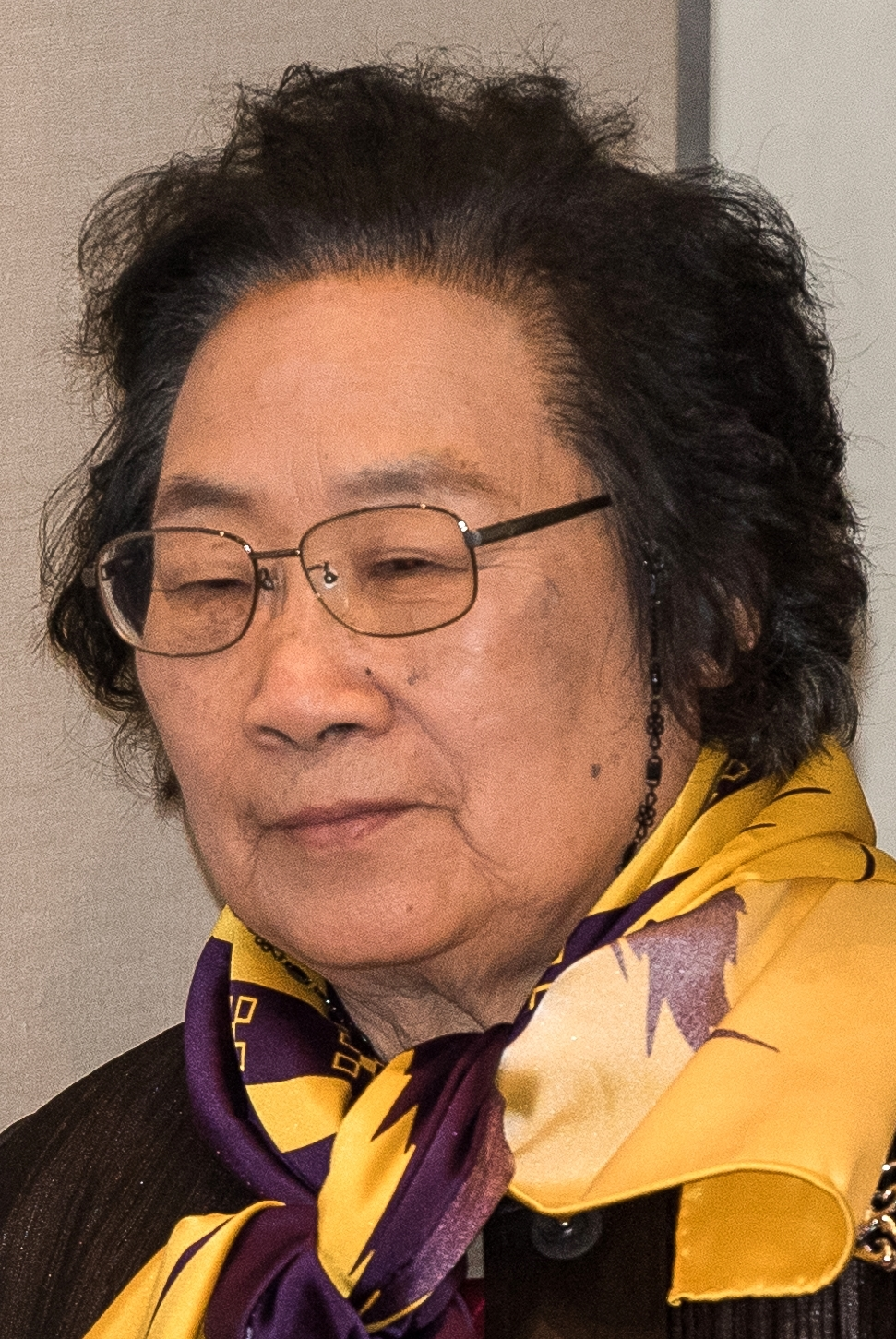
- Tu in 2015
- Born: 30 December 1930 (age 95); Ningbo, Zhejiang, Republic of China
- Education: Beijing Medical College (BMed) (Note: Peking University Medical School (北京大学医学院) became the independent Beijing Medical College (北京医学院) in 1952. Tu Youyou attended it between 1951 and 1955. Later in 1985 it was renamed Beijing Medical University (北京医科大学), and was returned to Peking University as Peking University Health Science Center (北京大学医学部) since 2005.)
- Known for: Discovering artemisinin and dihydroartemisinin
- Awards: Lasker-DeBakey Clinical Medical Research Award (2011); Warren Alpert Foundation Prize (2015); Nobel Prize in Physiology or Medicine (2015); Highest Science and Technology Award, China (2016); Medal of the Republic, China (2019)
- Scientific career
- Fields: Medicinal chemistry Chinese herbology Antimalarial medication Clinical research
- Workplaces: China Academy of Traditional Chinese Medicine (Note: The Beijing-based Academy of Traditional Chinese Medicine (中医研究院) was established in 1955 and renamed the China Academy of Traditional Chinese Medicine (中国中医研究院) in 1985 and then the China Academy of Traditional Chinese Medical Sciences (中国中医科学院) in 2005. Tu Youyou has been working at the Academy since 1955. The Academy was subsidiary to the Ministry of Health and is now directly under the State Administration of Traditional Chinese Medicine.)
- Academic advisors: Lou Zhicen

Chinese name
- Chinese: 屠呦呦
Transcriptions
Standard Mandarin
- Hanyu Pinyin: Tú Yōuyōu
- Wade–Giles: T'u^{2} Yu^{1}-yu^{1}
- IPA: [tʰǔ jóʊ.jóʊ]
Wu
- Romanization: Du^{1} Ieu^{1} Ieu^{1}

Tu Youyou (Chinese: 屠呦呦; pinyin: Tú Yōuyōu; born 30 December 1930) is a Nobel Prize-winning Chinese pharmaceutical chemist. She discovered artemisinin and dihydroartemisinin, used to treat malaria; these discoveries were a breakthrough in twentieth-century tropical medicine, saving millions of lives in South China, Southeast Asia, Africa, and South America. Tu was born, educated and carried out her research exclusively in China.

For her work, Tu received the 2011 Lasker Award in clinical medicine and the 2015 Nobel Prize in Physiology or Medicine jointly with William C. Campbell and Satoshi Ōmura. Tu is the first Chinese Nobel laureate in Physiology or Medicine and the first female citizen of the People's Republic of China to receive a Nobel Prize in any category. She is also the first Chinese person to receive the Lasker Award.

Tu was bestowed the Medal of the Republic, the highest honorary medal of the People's Republic of China, in September 2019.

== Early life ==
Tu was born in Ningbo, Zhejiang, China, on 30 December 1930.

My [first] name, Youyou, was given by my father, who adapted it from the sentence 呦呦鹿鳴, 食野之蒿 translated as "Deer bleat youyou while eating wild Hao" in the Chinese Book of Odes. How this links my whole life with qinghao will probably remain an interesting coincidence forever.

— Tu Youyou, when interviewed in 2011 after being awarded the 2011 Lasker-DeBakey Clinical Medical Research Award

She attended Xiaoshi Middle School for junior high school and the first year of high school, before transferring to Ningbo Middle School in 1948. A tuberculosis infection interrupted her high-school education, but inspired her to go into medical research.

From 1951 to 1955, she attended Beijing Medical College (now Peking University Health Science Center). In 1955, Youyou Tu graduated from Beijing Medical University School of Pharmacy and continued her research on Chinese herbal medicine in the China Academy of Chinese Medical Sciences. Tu studied at the Department of Pharmaceutical Sciences, and graduated in 1955. Later Tu was trained for two and a half years in traditional Chinese medicine.

After graduation, Tu worked at the Academy of Traditional Chinese Medicine (now the China Academy of Traditional Chinese Medical Sciences) in Beijing.

== Research career ==
Tu carried on her work in the 1960s and 70s, including during China's Cultural Revolution.

=== Schistosomiasis ===
During her early years in research, Tu studied Lobelia chinensis, a traditional Chinese medicine believed to be useful for treating schistosomiasis, caused by trematodes which infect the urinary tract or the intestines, which was widespread in the first half of the 20th century in South China.

=== Malaria ===
In 1967, during the Vietnam War, President Ho Chi Minh of North Vietnam asked Chinese Premier Zhou Enlai for help in developing a malaria treatment for his soldiers trooping down the Ho Chi Minh trail, where a majority came down with a form of malaria which is resistant to chloroquine. Because malaria was also a major cause of death in China's southern provinces, especially Guangdong and Guangxi, Zhou Enlai convinced Mao Zedong to set up a secret drug discovery project named Project 523 after its starting date, 23 May 1967.

In early 1969, Tu was appointed head of the Project 523 research group at her institute. Tu was initially sent to Hainan, where she studied patients who had been infected with the disease.

Scientists worldwide had screened over 240,000 compounds without success. In 1969, Tu, then 38 years old, had an idea of screening Chinese herbs. She first investigated the Chinese medical classics in history, visiting practitioners of traditional Chinese medicine all over the country on her own. She gathered her findings in a notebook called A Collection of Single Practical Prescriptions for Anti-Malaria. Her notebook summarized 640 prescriptions. By 1971, her team had screened over 2,000 traditional Chinese recipes and made 380 herbal extracts, from some 200 herbs, which were tested on mice.

One compound was particularly effective, sweet wormwood (Artemisia annua), which was used for "intermittent fevers," a hallmark of malaria. As Tu also presented at the project seminar, its preparation was described in a recipe from a 1,600-year-old traditional Chinese herbal medicine text titled Emergency Prescriptions Kept Up One's Sleeve. At first, it was ineffective because they extracted it with the traditional technique using hot water. Tu discovered that a low-temperature extraction process could be used to isolate an effective antimalarial substance from the plant; Tu says she was influenced by the source, written in 340 by Ge Hong, a scholar from the Jin dynasty, which states that this herb should be steeped in cold water. This book instructed the reader to immerse a handful of qinghao in water, wring out the juice, and drink it all. Since hot water damages the active ingredient in the plant, she proposed a method using low temperature ether to extract the effective compound instead. Animal tests showed it was effective in mice and monkeys.

In 1972, she and her colleagues obtained the pure substance and named it qinghaosu (青蒿素), or artemisinin in English. This substance has now saved millions of lives, especially in the developing world. Tu also studied the chemical structure and pharmacology of artemisinin. Tu's group first determined the chemical structure of artemisinin. In 1973, Tu was attempting to confirm the carbonyl group in the artemisinin molecule when she accidentally synthesized dihydroartemisinin.

Tu volunteered to be the first human test subject. "As head of this research group, I had the responsibility," she said. She had no bad reactions, so she conducted successful clinical trials with human patients. Her work was published anonymously in 1977. In 1981, she presented the findings related to artemisinin at a meeting with the World Health Organization.

Tu was awarded the Nobel Prize in Physiology or Medicine on 5 October 2015 "for her discoveries concerning a novel therapy against Malaria."

== Later career ==
Tu Youyou was promoted to Researcher (研究员, the highest researcher rank in mainland China equivalent to the academic rank of a full professor) in 1980, shortly after the beginning of the reform and opening up in 1978. In 2001, she was promoted to academic advisor for doctoral candidates. As of 2023, she is the chief scientist of the China Academy of Chinese Medical Sciences under the National Administration of Traditional Chinese Medicine.

As of 2007, her office is in an old apartment building in Dongcheng District, Beijing.

Tu is regarded as the "Three-Without Scientist" – no postgraduate degree (there was no postgraduate education then in China), no study or research experience abroad, and not a member of either of the Chinese national academies, the Chinese Academy of Sciences and Chinese Academy of Engineering. Tu is now regarded as a representative figure of the first generation of Chinese doctors since the establishment of the People's Republic of China in 1949.

== Awards ==
- 1978: National Science Congress Prize, P.R. China
- 1979: National Inventor's Prize, P.R. China
- 1992: (One of the) Ten Science and Technology Achievements in China, State Science Commission, P.R. China
- 1997: (Two of the) Ten Great Public Health Achievements in New China, P.R. China
- 2009: Cyrus Tang Traditional Chinese Medicine Award winner
- September 2011: GlaxoSmithKline Outstanding Achievement Award in Life Science
- September 2011: Lasker-DeBakey Clinical Medical Research Award
- November 2011: Outstanding Contribution Award, China Academy of Chinese Medical Sciences
- February 2012: (One of the Ten) National Outstanding Women, P.R. China (March 8th Red Banner Pacesetter)
- June 2015: Warren Alpert Foundation Prize (co-recipient)
- October 2015: Nobel Prize in Physiology or Medicine 2015 (co-recipient) for her discoveries concerning a novel therapy against malaria, awarded one half of this prize; and William C. Campbell and Satoshi Ōmura jointly awarded another half for their discoveries concerning a novel therapy against infection with roundworm parasites.
- 2016: Highest Science and Technology Award, China
- 2016 and 2019: Asian Scientist 100, Asian Scientist
- 2019: Medal of the Republic, P.R. China
- 2019: Time created 89 new covers to celebrate women of the year starting from 1920; it chose her for 1979
- 2025: Elected as International Member of US National Academy of Sciences

== See also ==
- Drug discovery
- Malaria, quinine and tropical medicine
- Antimalarial medications resulted from Project 523 (during and after the Cultural Revolution)
  - Artemisinin (major contributors: Tu Youyou et al., 1972)
  - Dihydroartemisinin (Tu Youyou et al., 1973)
  - Pyronaridine (1973)
  - Artemether (Zhou Weishan (周维善), 1975)
  - Lumefantrine (1976)
  - Artesunate (Liu Xu (刘旭), 1977)
  - Artemether/lumefantrine (Zhou Yiqing, 1985)
  - Naphthoquinone (1986)
- History of science and technology in the People's Republic of China
  - First artificial synthesis of (crystallized bovine) insulin (Niu Jingyi et al., 1965)
  - Discovery of using arsenic trioxide and tretinoin to treat leukemia (Zhang Tingdong, Wang Zhenyi, Chen Zhu & Chen Saijuan)
  - Dr Tang Feifan, discoverer of Chlamydia trachomatis, was expected to receive a Nobel Prize but died from political persecution in Beijing, 1958
  - Dr Wu Lien-teh, first Chinese nominated to receive a Nobel Prize in Physiology or Medicine (nominated in 1935)
- List of Chinese Nobel laureates and List of female Nobel laureates
- List of Chinese discoveries and List of Chinese inventions
- Chinese herbology and Traditional Chinese medicine
- Timeline of women in science
