= Ningbo High School =

- 宁波中学
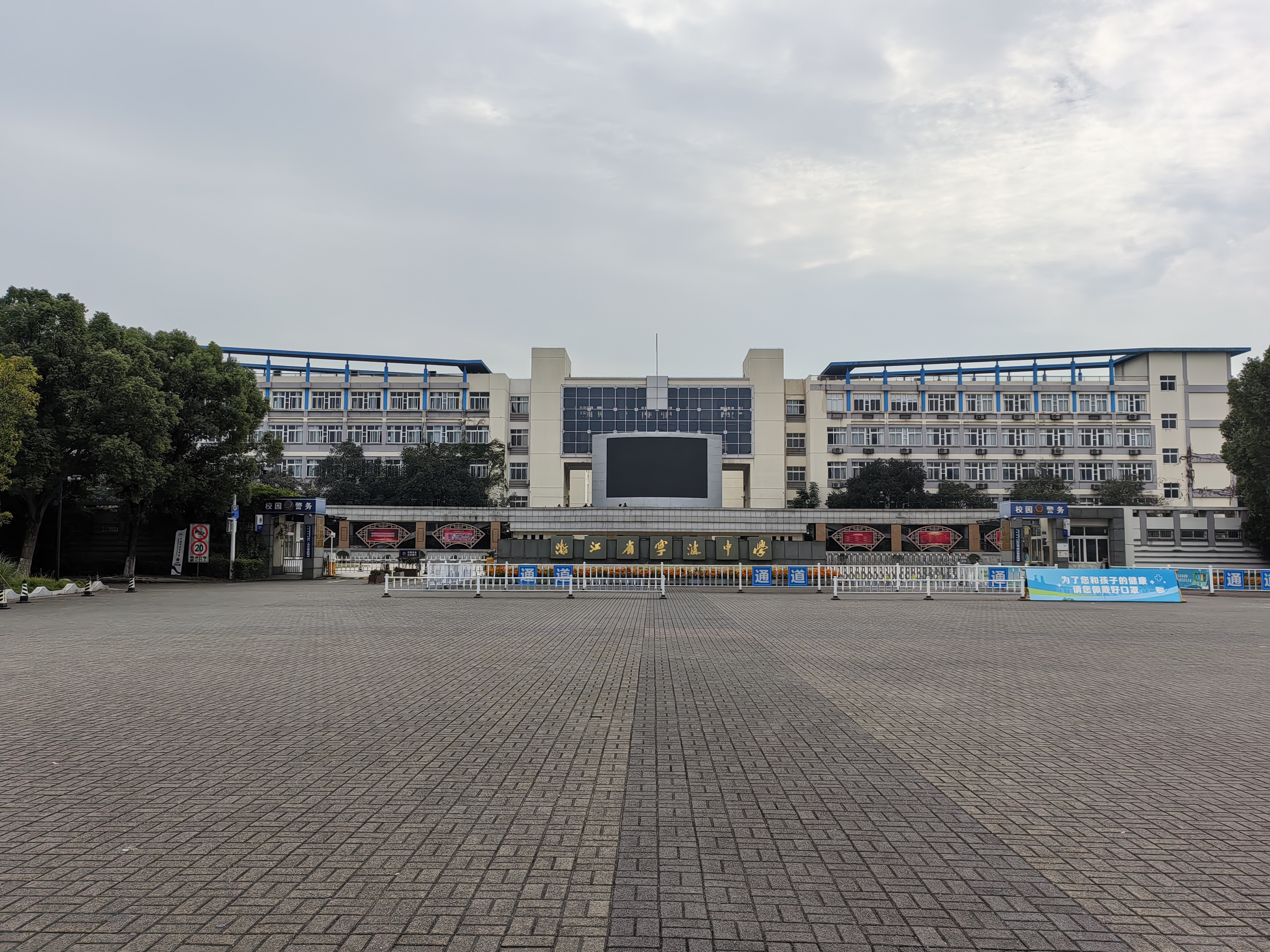

Information
- Established: 1898
- Principal: Shao Yingchun
- Campus size: 18.9 ha
- Graduates: 50,000+

Ningbo High School (Chinese: 宁波中学; pinyin: Níngbō Zhōngxué) is a high school offering education from a junior-high to senior-high level in Ningbo, Zhejiang province, China.

Founded in 1898, Ningbo High School is among the best provincial high schools. It has been acknowledged as the first modernized government-run boarding high school in Ningbo. It is a modern experimental school in education technology and one of the hundred provincial schools emphasizing science and research.

The junior part of Ningbo Middle School was departed from Ningbo Middle School in the spring 2000 due to complicated political reasons. The departed junior school was then named as XingNing Junior school. Though being literally independent from the old Ningbo High School, XingNing school still shares most of its faculties and facilities with the Ningbo High School

== Facts and figures ==
- Location: Higher educational park, south of Ningbo City, Zhejiang Province, China
- Size: 18.9 hectares of campus with a built area of more than 60,000 square meters
- Equipment: Well-equipped under the criteria for national model high schools
- Current principal: Ms. Shao Yingchun 邵迎春
- Goals: To shape first-rate management, to cultivate star teachers while pursuing top teaching quality, and to promote the school's renowned image.

=== School motto ===
- Self-discipline
- Self-reliance
- Self-improvement
- Carrying out self-awareness, scientific spirit and humanitarian accomplishments

== Renowned graduates ==
More than 50,000 students have graduated since 1898, a few well-known include:

=== Members of Chinese Academy of Science and Chinese Academy of Engineering ===
- Feng Ding (冯定, 1921)
- Yan Kai (严恺, 1929)
- Ren Mei'e (任美锷, 1929)
- Shi Zhongci (石钟慈, 1951)
- Wang Yangyuan (王阳元, 1953)
- He Xianshi (贺贤土, 1957)
- Yu Songlie (余松烈, 1935)
- Zhuang Hui (庄辉)

=== Notable alumni ===
- Sha Menghai (1919), artist
- Sha Wenhan (1923), president of Zhejiang Province, China
- Zhou Yao (周尧, 1920s), professor in entomology
- Wang Zhongshu (1940), archaeologist
- Fu Xuanzong (傅璇琮, 1951), president of Zhonghua Publishing
- Zhu Miaolong (1961), president of Qingdao University
- Zhang Heqi (张和祺, 1954), president of CAS (Chinese Academy of Science) astronomical observatory
- Ni Tianzeng (倪天增, 1956), VP of Shanghai, China
- Shen Zulun (1947), president of Zhejiang Province, China
- Chen Bulei (陈布雷, 1906), politician
- Zhang Qiyun (1919), historian, geographer, educator, politician
- He Yujie (何育杰, 1898), physicist
- Tu Youyou (屠呦呦, 1920) medical scientist, pharmaceutical chemist, educator, winner of 2015 Nobel prize in physiology or medicine
