= Artemisinic aldehyde Delta11(13)-reductase =

Class of enzymes

Identifiers
- EC no.: 1.3.1.92

Databases
- IntEnz: IntEnz view
- BRENDA: BRENDA entry
- ExPASy: NiceZyme view
- KEGG: KEGG entry
- MetaCyc: metabolic pathway
- PRIAM: profile
- PDB structures: RCSB PDB PDBe PDBsum
Search
- PMC: articles
- PubMed: articles
- NCBI: proteins

Artemisinic aldehyde Delta11(13)-reductase (EC 1.3.1.92, Dbr2) is an enzyme with systematic name artemisinic aldehyde:NADP^{+} oxidoreductase. This enzyme catalyses the following chemical reaction

artemisinic aldehyde
+ NADPH
H^{+}
H^{+}
(11R)-dihydroartemisinic aldehyde
+ NADP^{+}

The three substrates of this enzyme are artemisinic aldehyde, reduced nicotinamide adenine dinucleotide phosphate (NADPH), and a proton. Its products are (11R)-dihydroartemisinic aldehyde and oxidised NADP^{+}. This enzyme is present in Artemisia annua.
