= Streptomyces endophyticus =

Scientific classification
- Domain: Bacteria
- Kingdom: Bacillati
- Phylum: Actinomycetota
- Class: Actinomycetes
- Order: Streptomycetales
- Family: Streptomycetaceae
- Genus: Streptomyces
- Species: S. endophyticus

Binomial name
- Streptomyces endophyticus Li et al. 2013

Type strain
- CCTCC AA 209036, DSM 41984, YIM 65594

Species of bacterium

Streptomyces endophyticus is a bacterium species from the genus of Streptomyces which has been isolated from roots of the plant Artemisia annua L. in Kunming in the Yunnan province in China.

== See also ==
- List of Streptomyces species
