= Streptomyces artemisiae =

Scientific classification
- Domain: Bacteria
- Kingdom: Bacillati
- Phylum: Actinomycetota
- Class: Actinomycetia
- Order: Streptomycetales
- Family: Streptomycetaceae
- Genus: Streptomyces
- Species: S. artemisiae

Binomial name
- Streptomyces artemisiae Zhao et al. 2010

Type strain
- CCTCC AA 208059, DSM 41953, YIM 63135

Species of bacterium

Streptomyces artemisiae is a bacterium species from the genus Streptomyces which has been isolated from the plant Artemisia annua in the Yunnan Province in China.

== See also ==
- List of Streptomyces species
