= Elizabeth A. Winzeler =

American microbiologist

Elizabeth Ann Winzeler
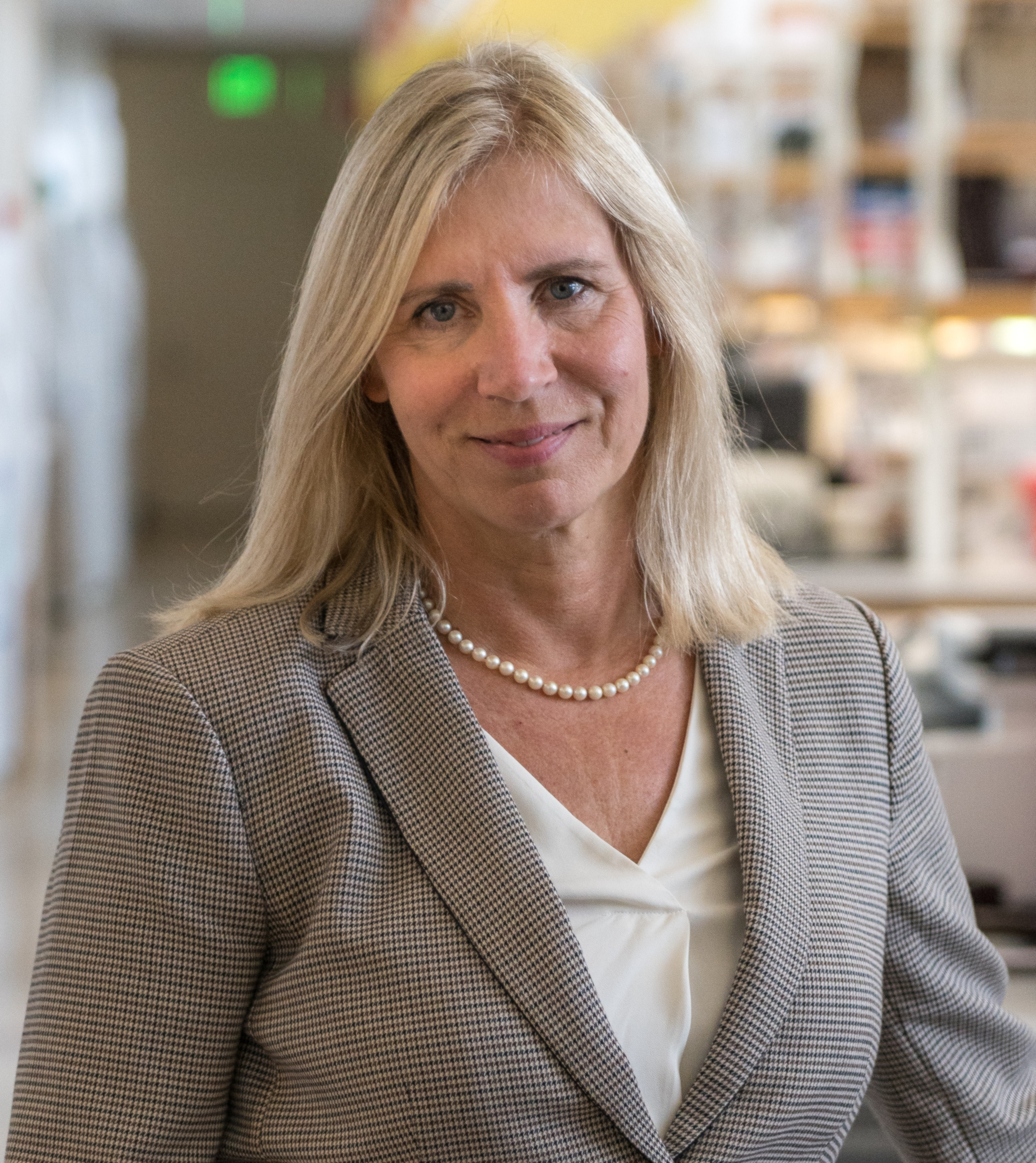
- Born: May 8, 1962; Canton, Ohio
- Citizenship: USA
- Education: Lewis and Clark College; Oregon State University; Stanford University
- Known for: Microbial genetics and genomics, drug design, drug resistance
- Scientific career
- Fields: microbiology molecular biology parasitology genetics drug discovery
- Institutions: University of California, San Diego
- Thesis: Transcriptional analysis of the Caulobacter 4.5 S RNA ffs gene and the physiological basis of an ffs mutant with a ts phenotype (1996)
- Doctoral advisor: Lucy Shapiro
- Other academic advisors: Ronald W. Davis
- Website: winzeler.ucsd.edu

Elizabeth Ann Winzeler is an American microbiologist and geneticist. She is a professor in the Division of Host-Microbe Systems and Therapeutics of the School of Medicine at the University of California at San Diego. Although she works in a variety of different disease areas, most research focuses on developing better medicines for the treatment and eradication of malaria.

== Early life and education ==
Winzeler is the daughter of anthropologist, Robert L. Winzeler. She grew up in Reno, Nevada, and attended Lewis and Clark College in Portland, Oregon. She received her B.A. in Natural Sciences and Art in 1984. After college, she worked as a professional programmer and systems analyst for four years before moving to Oregon State University in Corvallis, Oregon to earn a M.S. in Biophysics and Biochemistry. In 1996, she was awarded a Ph.D. from Stanford University in Developmental Biology for her studies on Caulobacter crescentus with Lucy Shapiro. She stayed at Stanford for postdoctoral work with Ronald W. Davis. At Stanford she played a leading role in developing seminal post-genome analysis methods in Saccharomyces cerevisiae.

== Career ==
In 1999, Winzeler was recruited by Peter G. Schultz to the newly established Genomics Institute of the Novartis Research Foundation. In 2000, she obtained a secondary position as an assistant professor in the Department of Cell Biology at Scripps Research. In 2012, she moved to the University of California, San Diego where she is currently a professor in the Department of Pediatrics and director of Translational Research at the UCSD Health Sciences Center for Immunity, Infection, and Inflammation. She is a member of the Division of Host Microbe Systems and Therapeutics and the Institute for Genomic Medicine.

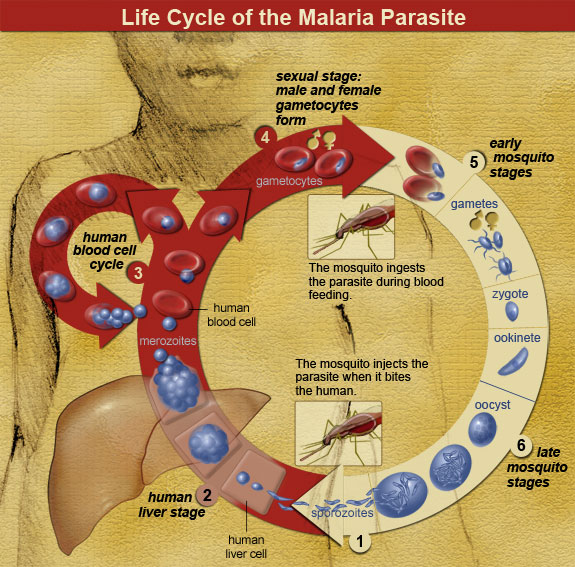
Malaria parasite life cycle

== Research ==
While she was still at Stanford University, she began working at the interface of genetics and informatics in the new field of functional genomics. After establishing her own lab, she began applying the powerful, high throughput methods that worked well in yeast to organisms that were both more medically relevant and experimentally-challenging, namely the protozoan Plasmodium parasites that cause human malaria. She showed that malaria parasites produce coordinated sets of gene messages as they progress through their complex lifecycle and developed methods for studying parasite genetic variation and genome evolution especially in relationship to the emergence of drug resistance. She is also known for developing phenotypic screening methods as well as contributions to drug development and Open Source Drug Discovery. Her group has developed screening methods that have led to the discovery of several new antimalarial chemotypes, two of which have been developed into clinical candidates. These include Ganaplacide (KAF156) and Cipargamin (KAE609). In addition, her lab discovered the targets of a variety of antimalarial compounds, including PfATP4, and Pf1-phosphatidylinositol 4-kinase. In 2017 she became director of the Bill and Melinda Gates Foundation Malaria Drug Accelerator (MALDA), an international consortium that seeks to develop better treatments for malaria. She is a member of the governing board of the Tres Cantos Open Lab Foundation.

== Awards and honors ==
- Ellison Medical Foundation New Scholar in Global Infectious Disease 2001
- W. M. Keck Foundation New Scholar Award 2004
- Howard T. Ricketts Symposium Lecture 2013
- Bailey K. Ashford Medal American Society of Tropical Medicine and Hygiene (ASTMH) 2014
- Fellow, American Academy of Microbiology 2016
- Medicines for Malaria Venture Project of the Year 2017
- Alice and C. C. Wang in Molecular Parasitology 2018
- William Trager Award on behalf of ASTMH and the American Committee of Molecular, Cellular and Immunoparasitology 2018
- Ruth Sonntag Nussenzweig Memorial Symposium 2019
- United Arab Emirates Crown Prince, Reaching the Last Mile Finalist 2019
- Rady Children's Hospital Awards of Excellence in Basic Research 2020
- UCSD Health Science Women Leadership Award 2020
- Elected to the National Academy of Medicine 2021
- Elected to the National Academy of Sciences 2025
