= Xiaoshi Middle School =

School in Ningbo, Zhejiang, China

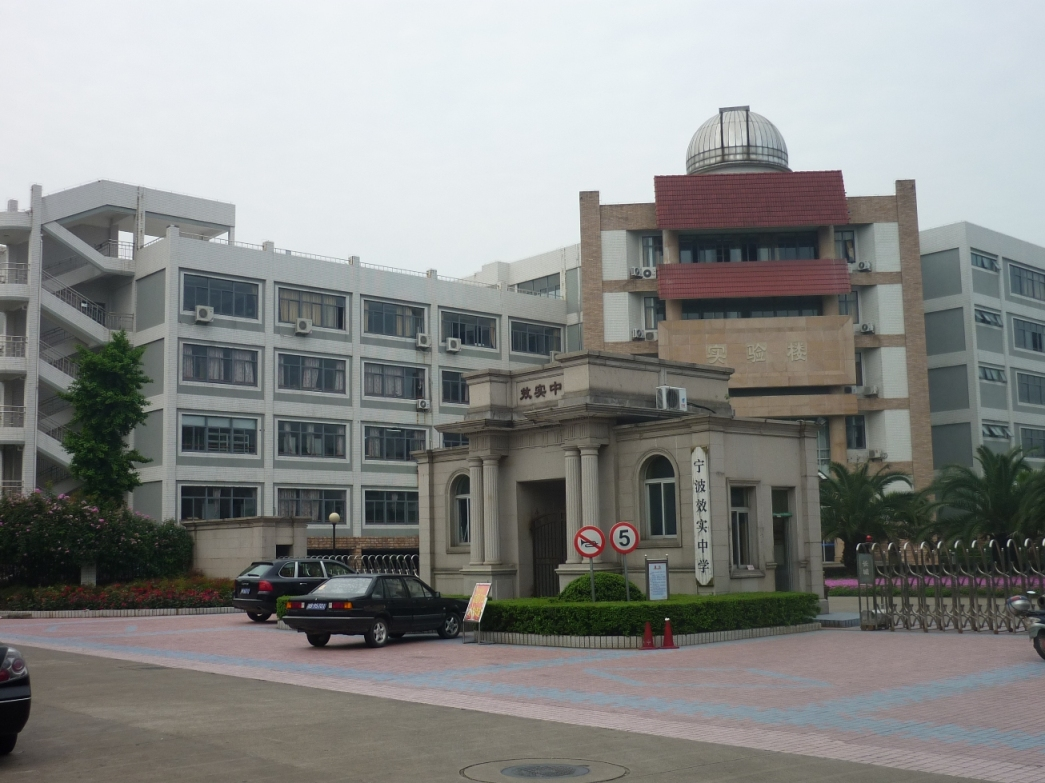

Xiaoshi Middle School (Chinese: 效实中学; pinyin: Xiàoshí Zhōngxué) or Xiaoshi High School, is a high school offering senior-high education in Ningbo, China. Formerly private school, Xiaoshi Middle School, with its long history of over 100 years, is regarded as one of the best schools in Eastern China.

== Overview ==
The school offers a 3-year education of senior high school.

Its current principal is Qiu Jianhao, principal of honour is Li Qingkun.

Xiaoshi has won a lot of awards in national and international competitions. It strives to develop students in every aspect and enjoys special prestige among Ningbo locals. Xiaoshi Middle School is especially strong at Maths Olympiad, sports and art performances.

Thanks to the commitment of the government, hundreds of millions of renminbi have been spent in the construction and upgrading of school buildings and infrastructure, including tennis courts, soccer field, 400m standard tracks and a mini sports stadium.

The school library currently stores more than 110,000 books and is open to all students.

Xiaoshi Middle School has more than 20 Co-Curriculum activities, including sports societies, astronomy club and literature salon.

=== Student Council ===
The student council of Xiaoshi Middle School is independent of the Communist Youth League and this is one of the main differences between Xiaoshi and other schools. However, the degree of autonomy of student council is still a matter for debate.

=== Declared School Motto ===
Patriotic, Progressive, Scientific, Practical (爱国、进步、科学、务实)

=== Declared Academic Requirement ===
Meticulous, Diligent, Truth-seeking, Creative (严谨、勤奋、求实、创新)

== Disambiguation ==
Due to some administrative regulation of the municipal government, the junior high school has been separated from the senior high school and renamed "Ningbo Foreign Language School" since 1991. In 2004, as the new campus built for the junior high school (Foreign Language School) was completed, the classes from junior high school moved there. In face of continuous opposition from parents of junior high school students, the process of formal separation has been fraught with troubles and conflicts. The process ended successfully in 2006 with intervention from the municipal educational board.

Although currently the junior high school and senior high school are two distinct entities, they are often referred to as "Xiaoshi Middle School" because of the long history the two schools shared.

Xiaoshi Middle School it is renowned for its excellent results in annual science and maths competition in Ningbo.

== History ==
Xiaoshi Middle School was established in 1912. The first principal was Chen Xianghan (陈祥翰). As a school built one year after the Chinese Nationalist Revolution (1911), Xiaoshi Middle School was dedicated to the mission of bringing new thoughts to China and nurturing talents for the Chinese society, which was under drastic changes then.

The founders of the school, He Yujie (何育杰), Ye Bingliang (叶秉良), Chen Xunzheng (陈训正) and Qian Baohang (钱保杭) organized "Xiaoshi Academic Community" under the guidance of their declared motto "with personal wealth and private management, contribute to education and lead the people to enlightenment" (以私力之经营，施实川之教育，为民治导先路). In the February of the following year, Xiaoshi Middle School was formally built in an abandoned site of a primary school. The name "Xiaoshi" came from Yan Fu, a famous Chinese thinker and political scientist, who wrote in his masterpiece "Tian Yan Lun" "The fittest survive as a result of natural selection; We must be pragmatic to truly exploit our potential" (物竞天择，效实储能). Soon after its establishment, Xiaoshi Middle School came to be known for its academic achievements and good discipline and consequently, its students enjoyed the privilege of entering Shanghai Fudan University and St. John University without attending the entrance exams. Later the school expanded and started teaching Japanese, French and German, with special focus on science, math and English.

In 1937, the outbreak of the Second Sino-Japanese War wreaked havoc on China's coastal areas. Xiaoshi Middle School was forced to move to rural area and at last stopped operating completely when the Japanese Imperial Army invaded Ningbo in 1941. In this traumatic era of Japanese Occupation, Cai Zengku (蔡增祜) organized "Qiushi Academic Society" (求实学社) in order to provide secondary education to Xiaoshi students. In 1945, after Japan was defeated by the Allied forces, Mr. Cai was in charge of the process of transition and formally reopened Xiaoshi Middle School on 25 October.

In 1956, the Communist government nationalized all private schools and Xiaoshi Middle School became a publicly funded school. It had been awarded the prestigious title of "the special school of significance" many times and acknowledged as one of the best schools of Zhejiang Province.

== Honors ==
Xiaoshi has received several honors. It was named a "Key School in the Province" as well as one of the "Best Key Schools in the Province", and "the Best First-Class Key School in the Province." In 1999 the Province chose Xiaoshi as one of two "Bases for Creative Teaching of Science," and it was chosen to be the "Experimental School of Modern Teaching Techniques" by the National Ministry of Education in 2000. In 2005, one more great honor was awarded to Xiaoshi by the National Ministry of Education as one of the "100 Famous Schools in China".

== New Campus ==
In 1999, Xiaoshi moved to its present campus. It covers an area of 126 mu with a construction area of 38,500 square meters. It consists of a classroom building complex, an administrative building, a laboratory, an audio-visual center, a library and several dormitory buildings with three cafeterias. The library has a collection of 110,000 books. A well-equipped gymnasium, Kuancheng Gymnasium after the donator, stands in the southwest of the campus covering 8765 square meters. There is a standard 400-meter sports field with rubber tracks. Several tennis, basketball, and volleyball courts are all around it. There are currently 42 classes, with 2,027 students and 252 teaching staff. The teaching facilities are being improved.

== Relationships ==
Xiaoshi has several long-term connections with many foreign countries and associations. In 1999, Xiaoshi established a good relationship with the Yale-China Association in the United States. In accordance with the agreement signed by both sides, Yale-China has sent 5 Yale graduates to teach at Xiaoshi, each working for 2 years (the agreement has since been terminated due to funding withdrawal). In the same year, the school established a sister-school relationship with Hopkins School in New Haven, Connecticut. Both schools sent exchange teachers to work in the other school. So far more than 7 teachers have benefited from this program. Meanwhile, Xiaoshi also has an agreement with Scotch College, Perth, which allows 8 Xiaoshi teachers each year to be sent for language training at Perth and two Perth teachers every year to teach at Xiaoshi for one year. Xiaoshi also has strong ties with three distinguished schools in Singapore, namely, Nanyang Girls' High School, Yishun Junior College and the Chinese High School. Each year more than 20 teachers and students from both sides exchange visits for about half a month.

Xiaoshi has also set up a program with Heinrich-Heine Gesamtschule in Germany. Every three years, Xiaoshi welcomes around 30 German students on its campus and the German host families have the pleasure of having Chinese visitors for about ten days. Moreover, the Witts Education Center in Hong Kong also sends foreign teachers to teach at Xiaoshi. Each year, Xiaoshi welcomes numerous groups of visitors from home and abroad. In 2001, a delegation led by the President of Yale University, Dr. Richard Levin, paid a visit to Xiaoshi. He spoke highly of the many achievements that Xiaoshi had made. In recent years, several Xiaoshi graduates have been accepted by world-famous universities, such as Harvard, Yale, Stanford, and Columbia University in the U.S. and Cambridge University in Britain for their bachelor's, master's or doctorate degrees.

== Alumni ==
Up to now, more than 30,000 students have graduated from Xiaoshi Middle School and a large number of them entered world-class universities, including Harvard, Yale, Stanford, California, MIT, Columbia, Oxford and Cambridge, to further their education.

=== Members of Chinese Academy of Science ===
- Tong Dizhou (童第周)
- Weng Wenbo (翁文波)
- Chen Zhongwei (陈中伟)
- Zhu Zuxiang (朱祖祥)
- Dai Chuanzeng (戴传曾)
- Ji Yufeng (纪育沣)
- Li Qingkui (李庆逵)
- Bao Wenkui (鲍文奎)
- Zhang Zongrong (张宗荣)
- Xu Zuyao (徐祖耀)

=== Members of Chinese Academy of Engineering ===
- Hu Side (胡思得)
- Zhou Guangyao (周光耀)
- Mao Yongze (毛用泽)
- Chen Zhaoyuan (陈肇元)
- Chen Jingxiong (陈敬熊)
- Tong Zhipeng (童志鹏)

=== Nobel Laureate ===
- Tu Youyou (屠呦呦, 2015 Nobel Prize in Physiology or Medicine)
