= Ruth Sonntag Nussenzweig =

Brazilian doctor, immunologist and parasitologist

Ruth Sonntag Nussenzweig (20 June 1928 – 1 April 2018) was an Austrian-Brazilian immunologist specializing in the development of malaria vaccines. In a career spanning over 60 years, she was primarily affiliated with New York University (NYU). She served as C.V. Starr Professor of Medical and Molecular Parasitology at Langone Medical Center, research professor at the NYU Department of Pathology, and finally professor emerita of Microbiology and Pathology at the NYU Department of Microbiology.

== Biography ==
Nussenzweig was born Ruth Sonntag in Vienna, Austria, to a secular Jewish family in which both of her parents were physicians. In 1939, after the Anschluss, the Sonntags fled to São Paulo, Brazil. While attending the University of São Paulo School of Medicine, she became involved in leftist politics and met Victor Nussenzweig, her future husband and lifelong research partner. After receiving her M.D., Nussenzweig moved to Paris for a research fellowship. In 1963, she did further graduate work at the NYU laboratory of immunologist Zoltán Óváry.

In 1965, the Nussenzweigs returned to São Paulo, and found that working conditions had become untenable since the 1964 military coup; many of their friends and colleagues had been jailed by the regime, and Victor was singled out for questioning by the school's new military administration. Through the intervention of Baruj Benacerraf, both Nussenzweigs obtained assistant professorships at NYU, and moved permanently to the United States. Nussenzweig returned briefly to Brazil to defend her doctoral thesis, earning her Ph.D. from the University of São Paulo in 1968.

Nussenzweig's family includes multiple people who have made significant contributions to research and academia, including husband Victor, professor emeritus at the NYU School of Medicine; son Michel C. Nussenzweig, professor of medicine at The Rockefeller University; daughter Sonia Nussenzweig-Hotimsky, professor of anthropology at the Foundation School of Sociology and Politics in São Paulo; and son Andre Nussenzweig, Distinguished Investigator at the National Institutes of Health.

== Research work ==
In 1967, Nussenzweig demonstrated that mice could acquire immunity to the Plasmodium berghei parasite. She did so by exposing the mice to P. berghei sporozoites that had been inactivated by X-ray irradiation.

== Major publications ==
- Huang, Jing; Li, Xiangming; Coelho-Dos-Reis, Jordana G A; Zhang, Min; Mitchell, Robert; Nogueira, Raquel Tayar; Tsao, Tiffany; Noe, Amy R; Ayala, Ramses; Sahi, Vincent; Gutierrez, Gabriel M; Nussenzweig, Victor; Wilson, James M; Nardin, Elizabeth H; Nussenzweig, Ruth S; Tsuji, Moriya. "Human immune system mice immunized with Plasmodium falciparum circumsporozoite protein induce protective human humoral immunity against malaria." Journal of Immunological Methods. 2015 Sep;:42-50
- Teixeira, Lais H; Tararam, Cibele A; Lasaro, Marcio O; Camacho, Ariane G A; Ersching, Jonatan; Leal, Monica T; Herrera, Socrates; Bruna-Romero, Oscar; Soares, Irene S; Nussenzweig, Ruth S; Ertl, Hildegund C J; Nussenzweig, Victor; Rodrigues, Mauricio M. "Immunogenicity of a Prime-Boost Vaccine Containing the Circumsporozoite Proteins of Plasmodium vivax in Rodents. Infection and Immunity. 2014 Feb;82(2):793-807
- Mishra, Satish; Nussenzweig, Ruth S; Nussenzweig, Victor. "Antibodies to Plasmodium circumsporozoite protein (CSP) inhibit sporozoite's cell traversal activity." Journal of Immunological Methods. 2012 Mar;377(1–2):47-52
- Camacho, Ariane Guglielmi Ariza; Teixeira, Lais Helena; Bargieri, Daniel Youssef; Boscardin, Silvia Beatriz; Soares, Irene da Silva; Nussenzweig, Ruth Sonntag; Nussenzweig, Victor; Rodrigues, Mauricio Martins. "TLR5-dependent immunogenicity of a recombinant fusion protein containing an immunodominant epitope of malarial circumsporozoite protein and the FliC flagellin of Salmonella Typhimurium." Memórias do Instituto Oswaldo Cruz. 2011 Aug;106 Suppl 1:167-171
- Mishra, Satish; Rai, Urvashi; Shiratsuchi, Takayuki; Li, Xiangming; Vanloubbeeck, Yannick; Cohen, Joe; Nussenzweig, Ruth S; Winzeler, Elizabeth A; Tsuji, Moriya; Nussenzweig, Victor. "Identification of non-CSP antigens bearing CD8 epitopes in mice immunized with irradiated sporozoites." Vaccine. 2011 Oct 6;29(43):7335-7342

== Awards ==
- Paul Ehrlich and Ludwig Darmstaedter Prize, 1985
- Carlos J. Finlay Prize for Microbiology (Cuba), 1985
- Albert B. Sabin Gold Medal, 2008
- Warren Alpert Foundation Prize, 2015
- National Order of Scientific Merit (Brazil)
