= Lou Zhicen =

Chinese pharmacognosist and educator

- 楼之岑
- Born: January 28, 1920; Xiaofeng County, Zhejiang, China
- Died: March 23, 1995 (aged 75); Beijing, China
- Education: National Military Medical Academy; University of London
- Scientific career
- Fields: Pharmacognosy
- Workplaces: Peking University Medical School
- Notable students: Tu Youyou

Lou Zhicen (simplified Chinese: 楼之岑; traditional Chinese: 樓之岑; pinyin: Lóu Zhīcén; 28 January 1920 – 23 March 1995) was a Chinese pharmacognosist and educator. Lou comes from a long line doctors and graduated from the University of London. Lou was a member of the Chinese Academy of Engineering. He was vice-president of the Chinese Pharmaceutical Association (CPA) and a member of the Chinese Pharmacopoeia Commission. He was chief editor of Chinese Pharmaceutical Journal and Bulletin of Chinese Materia Medica, and associate chief editor of Acta Pharmaceutica Sinica. Lou was the graduate tutor of Tu Youyou, who is a renowned pharmaceutical chemist, educator and Nobel laureate.

== Biography ==
Lou was born in Xiaofeng County (now Anji County), Zhejiang, Republic of China on January 28, 1920, to a family of physicians. He attended Xiaofeng County Sun Yat-sen Primary School and Zhejiang Provincial Huzhou Junior High School. In 1936 he was accepted to Zhejiang Provincial Xianghu Village Normal School and he entered Zhejiang Provincial Joint Normal School in February 1939. In the summer of 1939 he was accepted to National Military Medical Academy, after graduation, he taught there. In 1943 he became a member of the Chinese Chemical Society (CCS) and he was an editor of Quarterly Journal of Pharmacy. In September 1945 he entered the University of London, where he majored in pharmacognosy. He took up a post as research assistant in the Department of Pharmacology in 1948.

He returned to China (the newly established People's Republic) in January 1951 and in that year became an associate professor of the Department of Pharmacy at Zhejiang University. Seven months later, he taught at Peking University Medical School (later Beijing Medical College, now Peking University Health Science Center). He was elected a member of the Chinese Academy of Engineering in June 1994.

He died on March 23, 1995, in Beijing.
