= Cubosome =

Certain type of chemical structures

The chemical structure of 1-monoolein, the primary studied lipid building block of a cubosome. It is used to form the bilayer of the membrane.

Cubosomes are discrete, sub-micron, nanostructured particles of the bicontinuous cubic liquid crystalline phase. The term "bicontinuous" refers to two distinct hydrophilic regions separated by the bilayer. Bicontinuous cubic crystalline materials have been an active research topic because their structure lends itself well to controlled-release applications.

Cubosomes are liquid crystalline nano-structures formed from the cubic phase of lipids, such as monooleate, or any other amphiphilic macromolecules with the unique property to be dispersed into particles. Nano-vehicles are generated from a self-assembled lipid mixture and studied by means of high-resolution cryogenic transmission electron microscope (cryo-TEM). These structures have been observed to naturally occur in mitochondrial membranes and in stressed cells.

Cubosomes are formed at controlled temperatures into lipid bi-layer twisted into three dimension with minimal surface forming a tightly packed structure with bicontinuous domains of water and lipid. There are three different proposed phases that these cubic structures can be in: the P-surface, G-surface and D-surface for primitive, gyroid and diamond structures respectively. This variation in structure allows for cubosomes to be the ultimate drug delivery system due to its ability to maintain the structural integrity of the ingredients that it carries. The uses of cubosomes are still being researched but they range from systems for efficient drug delivery into specific body systems to stabilizing and producing palladium nanoparticles.

== Uses ==
For most fluids and some homogenous solid materials, like gels, diffusion is the same in all directions and characterized by the same diffusion coefficient number. This property is called isotropicity which gives cubosomes the ability to be used in biological tissues which are highly structured and typically have different diffusion coefficients along different directions (anisotropic). Because of advantages such as the unique structure of the cubic phase and its resemblance to biological membranes as well as biodegradability of lipids, cubosomes are a great tool for drug delivery system. In addition, the bicontinuous cubic liquid crystalline phase (cubic phase)’s tortuosity is useful for slowing down diffusion as shown by Higuchi’s square root of time release kinetics. Capability to encapsulate hydrophilic, hydrophobic, and amphiphilic substance, being simple to prepare, and all the aforementioned qualities give cubosomes a property that can be used in controlled transport applications as drug delivery vehicles.
