= Halofuginone =

Chemical compound

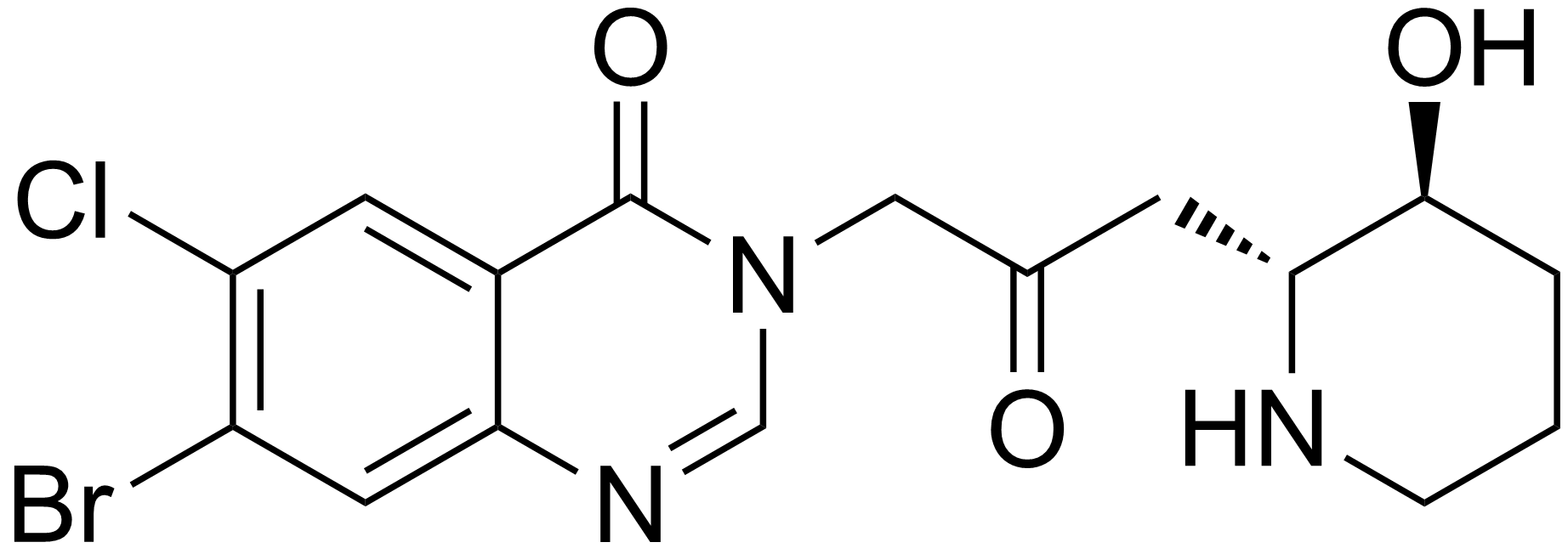

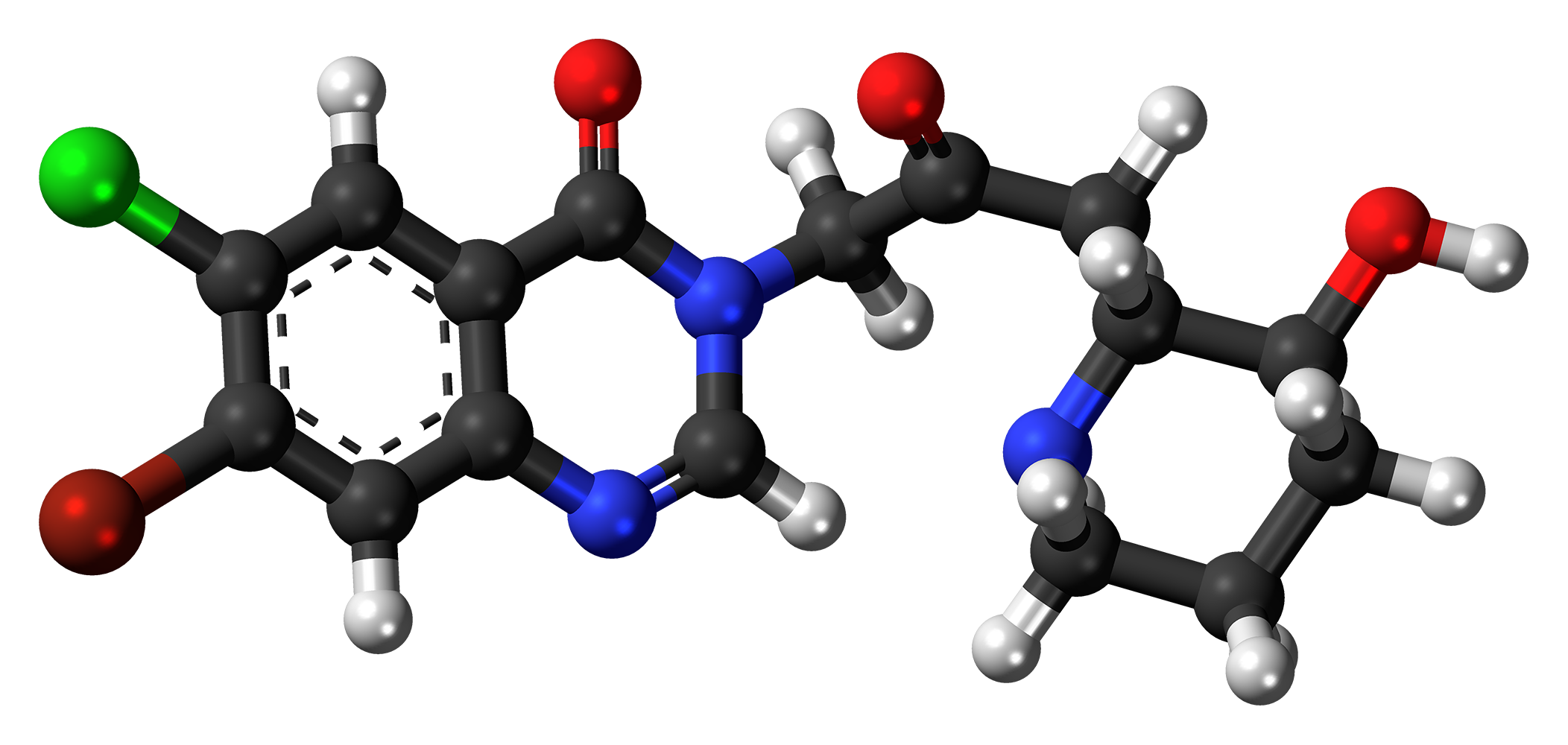

Clinical data
- Trade names: Halocur
- AHFS/Drugs.com: International Drug Names
- ATCvet code: QP51BX01 (WHO)

Legal status
- Legal status: EU: Rx-only

Identifiers
- IUPAC name: 7-Bromo-6-chloro-3-[3-[(2S,3R)-3-hydroxy-2-piperidinyl]-2-oxopropyl]-4-quinazolinone
- CAS Number: 55837-20-2
- PubChem CID: 400772
- ChemSpider: 355164
- UNII: L31MM1385E
- ChEMBL: ChEMBL1199540
- CompTox Dashboard (EPA): DTXSID0048260

Chemical and physical data
- Formula: C_{16}H_{17}BrClN_{3}O_{3}
- Molar mass: 414.68 g·mol^{−1}
- 3D model (JSmol): Interactive image
- SMILES: O=C(CN3C=NC2=CC(Br)=C(Cl)C=C2C3=O)C[C@@H]1NCCC[C@H]1O
- InChI: InChI=1S/C16H17BrClN3O3/c17-11-6-13-10(5-12(11)18)16(24)21(8-20-13)7-9(22)4-14-15(23)2-1-3-19-14/h5-6,8,14-15,19,23H,1-4,7H2/t14-,15+/m0/s1; Key:LVASCWIMLIKXLA-LSDHHAIUSA-N

Halofuginone, sold under the brand name Halocur, is a coccidiostat used in veterinary medicine. It is a synthetic halogenated derivative of febrifugine, a natural quinazolinone alkaloid which can be found in the Chinese herb Dichroa febrifuga (Chang Shan). Collgard Biopharmaceuticals is developing halofuginone for the treatment of scleroderma and it has received orphan drug designation from the U.S. Food and Drug Administration.

EPRS1 acts, in human cells, as a proviral factor in mammarenaviruses infection, including LCMV, JUNV, and LASV, and its inhibition using halofuginon compound, a prolyl domain inhibitor, completely abolishes the viral infection by interrupting viral assembly and budding.

Halofuginone inhibits the development of T helper 17 cells, immune cells that play an important role in autoimmune disease, but it does not affect other kinds of T cells which are involved in normal immune function. Halofuginone therefore has potential for the treatment of autoimmune disorders.

Halofuginone is also an inhibitor of collagen type I gene expression and as a consequence it may inhibit tumor cell growth. Halofuginone exerts its effects by acting as a high affinity inhibitor of the enzyme glutamyl-prolyl tRNA synthetase. Inhibition of prolyl tRNA charging leads to the accumulation of uncharged prolyl tRNAs, which serve as a signal to initiate the amino acid starvation response, which in turn exerts anti-inflammatory and anti-fibrotic effects.
