= PfATP6 =

P-type calcium transporting ATPase

Identifiers
- Organism: Plasmodium falciparum
- Symbol: PfATP6
- Alt. symbols: PfATPase6
- Entrez: 3974689
- Orthologs: NCBI: entry

PfATP6, also known as PfSERCA or PfATPase6, is a calcium ATPase gene encoded by the malaria parasite Plasmodium falciparum. The protein is thought to be a P-type ATPase involved in calcium ion transport.

Mutations in PfATP6 that had been identified in field isolates (such as S769N) and in laboratory clones (such as L263E) were shown to have decreased sensitivity to artemisinin but conversely were more susceptible to other compounds targeting SERCAs. In a yeast expression system looking at mutations L263E, A623E, S769N, and A623E/S769N it was shown that there was a fitness cost to these mutations compared to the wild-type.

== Resistance to artemisinin antimalarials ==
Research in 2003 indicated that PfATP6 is a target of artemisinin (a potent antimalarial drug). It was observed that single amino acid mutations in PfATP6 could abolish sensitivity to artemisinin compounds. Evidence came from a Xenopus oocyte system describing specific interactions between artemisinins and PfATP6 as well as E255L-mutated mammalian SERCA and from parasites in French Guiana with mutations in PfATP6 making them less susceptible to inhibition by artemether. An independent assessment using the Xenopus oocyte system reported in 2016 that while PfATP6 protein could be detected, activity was not observed. In the independent oocyte work, mammalian SERCA and its E255L-mutated version were active but both were insensitive to artemisinin, again in contrast to the original claims. The authors suggested that the original results might have been affected by low ATPase signals, few experimental repeats and large standard deviations. The lack of artemisinin inhibition of E255L mammalian SERCA matched results from highly purified extracts obtained after heterologous expression in yeast cells.

More recently, research has supported the role of PfATP6 in artemisinin therapy; direct interaction of artemisinin with PfATP6 was further noted in 2016 in an in vivo screen of the malaria parasite with a tagged drug molecule in two independent studies; 124 separate Pf proteins and >60 proteins that bound to this molecule were identified. This work was substantiated in 2022 using a functional whole cell assay after yeast heterologous expression and in vitro identifying PfATP6 as both a binding partner and capable of functional inhibition by artemisinin compounds. The same system confirmed that mutated mammalian SERCA1 (E255L) is more susceptible to inhibition by artemisinins. Intraparasitic free calcium concentrations are increased after exposure to an artemisinin. In 2022 it was observed in murine neutrophils that artemisinins were inhibiting migration of these cells. Further investigation pinpointed the mechanism of neutrophil functions to inhibition of the activity of a homologue of PfATP6, SERCA3. This research supports the case for artemisinin activity with malaria SERCAs.

PfATP6 mutations play no role in the reduced artemisinin susceptibility observed in southeast Asia. The consensus is that PfATP6 is a validated target for artemisinins and mammalian SERCA3, in neutrophils, has emerged as a newly identified target.
