= Lumefantrine =

Group of enantiomers

Clinical data
- Other names: benflumetol
- AHFS/Drugs.com: International Drug Names
- MedlinePlus: a609024
- Routes of administration: Oral
- ATC code: P01BF01 (WHO) (combination with artemether)

Legal status
- Legal status: US: C; EU: Rx-only

Pharmacokinetic data
- Protein binding: 99.7%
- Metabolites: desbutyl-lumefantrine
- Elimination half-life: 3-6 days

Identifiers
- IUPAC name: 2-(Dibutylamino)-1-[(9Z)-2,7-dichloro-9-(4-chlorobenzylidene)-9H-fluoren-4-yl]ethanol
- CAS Number: 82186-77-4; 120583-70-2
- PubChem CID: 6437380
- DrugBank: DB06708
- ChemSpider: 4941944
- UNII: F38R0JR742; ZUV4B00D9P
- KEGG: D03821
- ChEBI: CHEBI:156095
- ChEMBL: ChEMBL38827
- CompTox Dashboard (EPA): DTXSID3046663
- ECHA InfoCard: 100.133.797

Chemical and physical data
- Formula: C_{30}H_{32}Cl_{3}NO
- Molar mass: 528.94 g·mol^{−1}
- 3D model (JSmol): Interactive image
- Melting point: 130 to 132 °C (266 to 270 °F)
- Solubility in water: 30.9ng/mL
- SMILES: Clc1ccc(cc1)\C=C3\c4c(c2c(cc(Cl)cc23)C(O)CN(CCCC)CCCC)ccc(Cl)c4
- InChI: InChI=1S/C30H32Cl3NO/c1-3-5-13-34(14-6-4-2)19-29(35)28-18-23(33)17-27-25(15-20-7-9-21(31)10-8-20)26-16-22(32)11-12-24(26)30(27)28/h7-12,15-18,29,35H,3-6,13-14,19H2,1-2H3/b25-15-; Key:DYLGFOYVTXJFJP-MYYYXRDXSA-N

Lumefantrine (or benflumetol) is an antimalarial drug. It is only used in combination with artemether. This combination is frequently the first-line medication for Plasmodium falciparum malaria. Lumefantrine has a much longer half-life compared to artemether (3-6 days vs. 2 hours), and is therefore thought to clear any residual parasites that remain after combination treatment.

== Mechanism of action ==
The exact mechanism by which lumefantrine acts on erythrocytic stages of Plasmodium falciparum is unknown. However, it was shown to exert its action through possible two mechanisms:

- inhibiting β-hematin formation by creating complexes with hemin
- inhibiting nucleic acid and protein synthesis

Moreover, it was shown to interact with human sodium/potassium ATPase subunit α1.

== Metabolism ==
Lumefantrine is metabolised in the liver by cytochrome P450 3A4 isoenzyme (CYP3A4) and 2D6 (CYP2D6), yielding desbutyl-lumefantrine as a major metabolite.

== Adverse effects ==
Lumefantrine, as used in combination with artemether, was shown to induce the following side effects:

- prolongation of QT interval, especially in combination with other drugs exhibiting the same effects or in patients with congenital prolongation of the QT interval
- hypersensitivity reactions
- interactions with CYP3A4 and CYP2D6 inducing or inhibiting drugs
- infertility (sperm abnormalities and trouble getting pregnant)

People taking efavirenz as a part of HIV therapy should be wary of potential deviations during treatment, due to a decrease of AUC of this antiretroviral.

== History ==
Lumefantrine, along with pyronaridine and naphthoquine, were synthesized during the Chinese Project 523 antimalaria drug research effort initiated in 1967; these compounds are all used in combination antimalaria therapies.

== Research ==
Lumefantrine is being investigated as a part of a regimen with ganaplacide for the treatment of Plasmodium falciparum malaria.

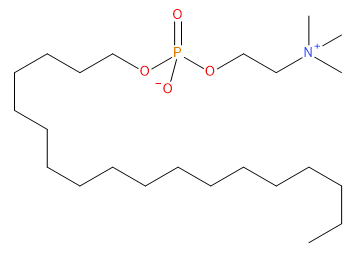
O-choline

Along with O-choline (octadecyl 2-(trimethylammonio)ethyl phosphate), lumefantrine inhibits in vivo growth of Theileria equi and Babesia caballi, due to inhibition of membrane phospholipid synthesis, hemoglobin digestion and targeting lactate metabolism. Additionally, it can inhibit Babesia gibsoni growth in vitro (synergistically with artemisinin derivatives).

It may exert negative effects on aquatic ecosystems by adversely acting on Chlorella vulgaris, Raphidocelis subcapitata, Lemna minor and Microcystis aeruginosa. Moreover, it is classified as a potential endocrine disrupting compound by decreasing FSHB and increasing prolactin secretion.

Lumefantrine and calcium phosphate-loaded lipid nanoparticles or cubosomes were investigated as a potential treatment of lung cancer due to probable antiangiogenic and anti-inflammatory properties of this combination.

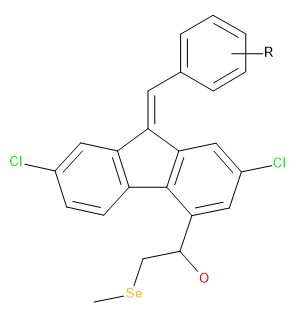
General structure of selene-containing lumefantrine derivatives

Selenium-containing lumefantrine derivatives synthesised through Knoevenagel condensation (which itself is used to synthesise lumefantrine) exhibit potential antibacterial and antifungal activity. Compared with ciprofloxacin, they were shown to more potently bind to E. coli MurB enzyme – an enzyme participating in cell cycle and cell wall synthesis.

== See also ==
- Artemether/lumefantrine
- Halofantrine
