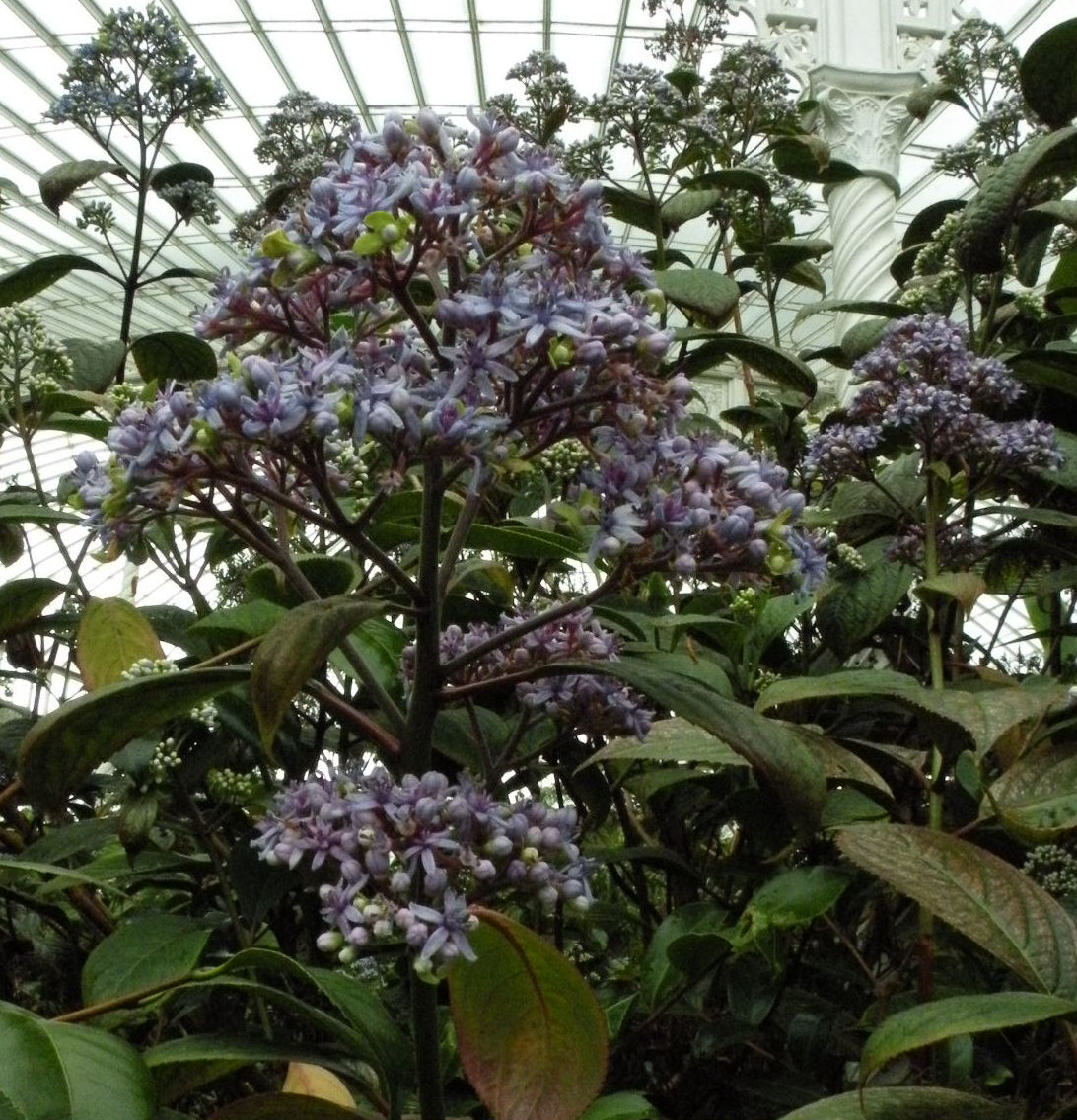

Scientific classification
- Kingdom: Plantae
- Clade: Embryophytes
- Clade: Tracheophytes
- Clade: Angiosperms
- Clade: Eudicots
- Clade: Asterids
- Order: Cornales
- Family: Hydrangeaceae
- Genus: Hydrangea
- Species: H. febrifuga

Binomial name
- Hydrangea febrifuga (Lour.) Y.De Smet & Granados

Synonyms
- Synonymy: Adamia chinensis Gardner & Champ.; Adamia sylvatica Meisn.; Callicarpa esquirolii H.Lév.; Callicarpa leveilleana Fedde; Cianitis chinensis Hook.f. & Thomson; Cianitis sylvatica Reinw.; Dichroa cyanitis Miq.; Dichroa febrifuga Lour. (basionym); Dichroa febrifuga var. glabra S.Y.Hu; Dichroa henryi H.Lév.; Dichroa latifolia Miq.; Dichroa parviflora Schltr.; Dichroa pentandra Schltr.; Dichroa philippinensis Schltr.; Dichroa pubescens Miq.; Dichroa schumanniana Schltr.; Dichroa sylvatica (Reinw.) Mottet; Dichroa thyrsoidea Elmer; Hydrangea pubescens Zipp. ex Miq.

= Hydrangea febrifuga =

Species of plant

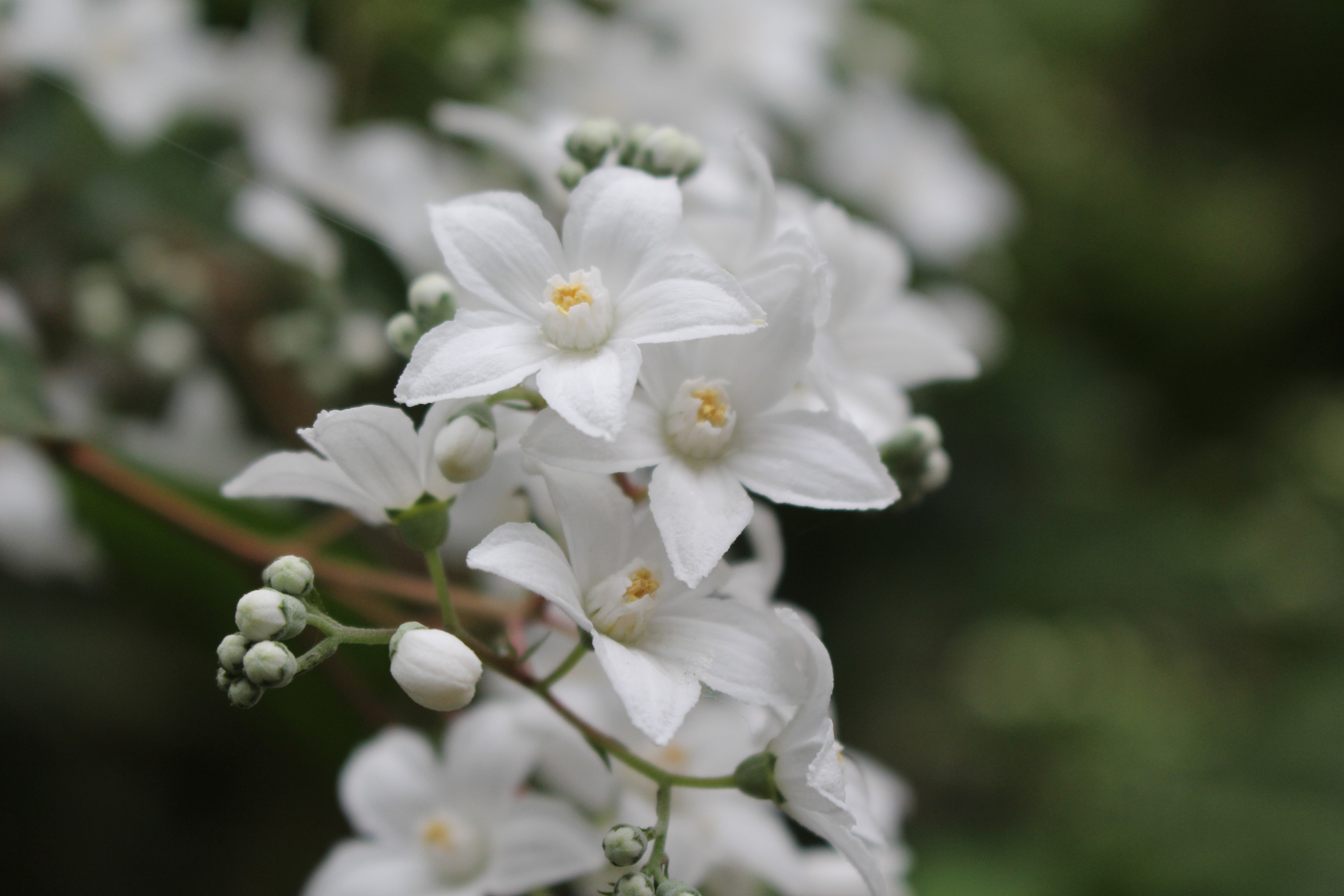
A white flowering variety

Hydrangea febrifuga is a flowering plant in the family Hydrangeaceae. It is a subshrub or shrub native to central and southern China, Indochina, Malesia, and New Guinea.

== National names ==
- Chinese: Chinese: 常山; pinyin: chángshān)
- Indonesian language: gigil, alternatively tataruman
- Sundanese: ramram
- Papua: Hom dong (ฮอมดง):
- Thai: Yai khlang yai (ยายคลังใหญ่), in Nakhon Sri Thammarat, Yai Krang (ยายกรัง) in the South, and Hom Kham (ฮอมคำ) in Lanna (Northern Thai).

== Traditional Chinese medicine ==
Dichroa febrifuga is an important herb in traditional Chinese medicine, where it is considered one of the 50 fundamental herbs. The alkaloids febrifugine and isofebrifugine are believed to be responsible for its antimalarial effects. In traditional preparations, it is used in conjunction with other plants such as Glycyrrhiza glabra (licorice), Ziziphus jujuba and Zingiber officinale (ginger).

== Potential drug against autoimmune disease ==
Halofuginone, sold under the brand name Halocur, is a coccidiostat used in veterinary medicine. It is a synthetic halogenated derivative of febrifugine, a natural quinazolinone alkaloid which can be found in dichroa febrifuga.

Halofuginone inhibits the development of T helper 17 cells, immune cells that play an important role in autoimmune disease, but it does not affect other kinds of T cells which are involved in normal immune function. Halofuginone therefore has potential for the treatment of autoimmune disorders.
