= Sha Wenhan =

Chinese politician and University president

Sha Wenhan (simplified Chinese: 沙文汉; traditional Chinese: 沙文漢; pinyin: Shā Wénhàn; 1908–1964), was a Chinese historian, revolutionary, educator and politician. He served as Governor of Zhejiang Province and President of Zhejiang University.

== Biography ==
Sha was born 1908 in Yin County (now Yinzhou District, Ningbo), Zhejiang Province. Sha's original name was Sha Wenyuan (Chinese: 沙文沅), his courtesy name was Wenshu (文舒), and used aliases like Chen Yuanyang (陈元阳) and Zhang Deng (张登). One of Sha's brothers, Sha Menghai, was a famous Chinese calligraphy master. His nephew was the modern painter, Sha Qi (沙耆; 1914–2005), also known as "Sadji".

Sha studied at Zhejiang Provincial 4th Normal School (浙江省立第四师范学校) in Ningbo. Then he transferred to a financial school. In April 1925, Sha joined the Chinese Communist Party (CCP). In summer 1925 in Ningbo, Sha participated in the activity which supported the May Thirtieth Movement in Shanghai. In 1926, Sha graduated from the financial school, went back to Yin County, and led some local peasants movements. In November 1927, Sha became the CCP Committee Secretary of Fenghua City.

In January 1928, Sha went to study in Shanghai. In July 1929, Sha went to Moscow and studied at the Communist University of the Toilers of the East, where he studied Russian Marxism-Leninism and met his future wife Chen Xiuliang (陈修良). In February 1932, Sha went to Tokyo, Japan, and studied at the Imperial University of Tokyo and Japan Railway School (日本铁道学校?). In 1934, Sha went back to Shanghai but soon to Tokyo again. In 1940, Sha was the acting CCP party chief (Secretary-general) of Jiangsu Province.

After 1949, Sha was appointed as the President of Zhejiang University in Hangzhou. In December 1954, Sha became the Governor of Zhejiang Province. In 1957, Sha was dismissed from the CCP in the Anti-Rightist Movement; Sha was the highest-ranked victim in the early phase of this political movement. On 2 January 1964, Sha died in Hangzhou.

Sha wrote many articles and one monograph about Chinese history. He was an accomplished writer.

== Work ==
- 《沙文汉诗文选集》(Poetic and Literal Collections of Sha Wenhan); ISBN 7-80618-502-X; Shanghai Academy of Social Sciences (a branch of the Chinese Academy of Social Sciences) Press; 1998; 44 Chapters, 435 Pages.
