= Halofantrine =

Chemical compound

Clinical data
- Trade names: Halfan
- AHFS/Drugs.com: Consumer Drug Information
- MedlinePlus: a603030
- Routes of administration: Oral
- ATC code: P01BX01 (WHO)

Pharmacokinetic data
- Protein binding: 60–70%
- Metabolism: Hepatic (CYP3A4-mediated)
- Elimination half-life: 6–10 days

Identifiers
- IUPAC name: 3-(Dibutylamino)-1-[1,3-dichloro-6-(trifluoromethyl)-9-phenanthryl]-1-propanol
- CAS Number: 69756-53-2
- PubChem CID: 37393
- DrugBank: DB01218
- ChemSpider: 34303
- UNII: Q2OS4303HZ
- ChEMBL: ChEMBL1107
- CompTox Dashboard (EPA): DTXSID0023119
- ECHA InfoCard: 100.067.346

Chemical and physical data
- Formula: C_{26}H_{30}Cl_{2}F_{3}NO
- Molar mass: 500.43 g·mol^{−1}
- 3D model (JSmol): Interactive image
- SMILES: FC(F)(F)c3ccc2c(cc1c(Cl)cc(Cl)cc1c2c3)C(O)CCN(CCCC)CCCC
- InChI: InChI=1S/C26H30Cl2F3NO/c1-3-5-10-32(11-6-4-2)12-9-25(33)23-16-22-21(14-18(27)15-24(22)28)20-13-17(26(29,30)31)7-8-19(20)23/h7-8,13-16,25,33H,3-6,9-12H2,1-2H3; Key:FOHHNHSLJDZUGQ-UHFFFAOYSA-N

Halofantrine is a drug used to treat malaria. Halofantrine's structure contains a substituted phenanthrene, and is related to the antimalarial drugs quinine and lumefantrine. Marketed as Halfan, halofantrine is never used to prevent malaria and its mode of action is unknown, although a crystallographic study showed that it binds to hematin in vitro, suggesting a possible mechanism of action. Halofantrine has also been shown to bind to plasmepsin, a haemoglobin degrading enzyme unique to the malarial parasites.

Halofantrine was developed at SRI International for the Walter Reed Army Institute of Research from 1965 to 1975 by a team led by medicinal chemist William Colwell.

== Adverse reactions ==
Halofantrine can cause abdominal pain, diarrhoea, vomiting, rash, headache, itching and elevated liver enzymes.

It can be associated with cardiotoxicity. The most dangerous side effect is cardiac arrhythmias: halofantrine causes significant QT prolongation, and this effect is seen even at standard doses. The drug should therefore not be given to patients with cardiac conduction defects and should not be combined with mefloquine. A survey from 2009 suggests that the drug is safe when correctly administered.

== Other adverse reactions ==
Consumption of grapefruit combined with certain medications can cause serious side effects, even death. Halofantrine combined with this fruit or grapefruit juice is dangerous. The mechanism of action is inhibition of CYP3A4, which is necessary to metabolize the drug and eliminate it from the body. Without CYP3A4, levels of the drug will become toxic in the body.

== Pharmacology ==
The mechanism of action of halofantrine is unknown. The absorption of halofantrine is erratic, but is increased when taken with fatty food. Because of fears of toxicity due to increased halofantrine blood levels, halofantrine should be taken on an empty stomach.

Plasma levels peak at 16 hours and the half-life of the drug is about 4 days.

== Uses ==
Halofantrine is only used to treat malaria. It is not used to prevent malaria (prophylaxis) because of the risk of toxicity and unreliable absorption.

== Dosing ==
Adult dose: three doses of 500 mg six hours apart. Halofantrine should be taken on an empty stomach.

== Manufacturing information and availability ==
Halfan (GlaxoSmithKline) is available as 250 mg tablets. A full course of treatment (6 tablets) costs US$1.40 in the developing world. Halofantrine is not available in the UK or U.S.
