= Sha Menghai =

Chinese artist and calligrapher

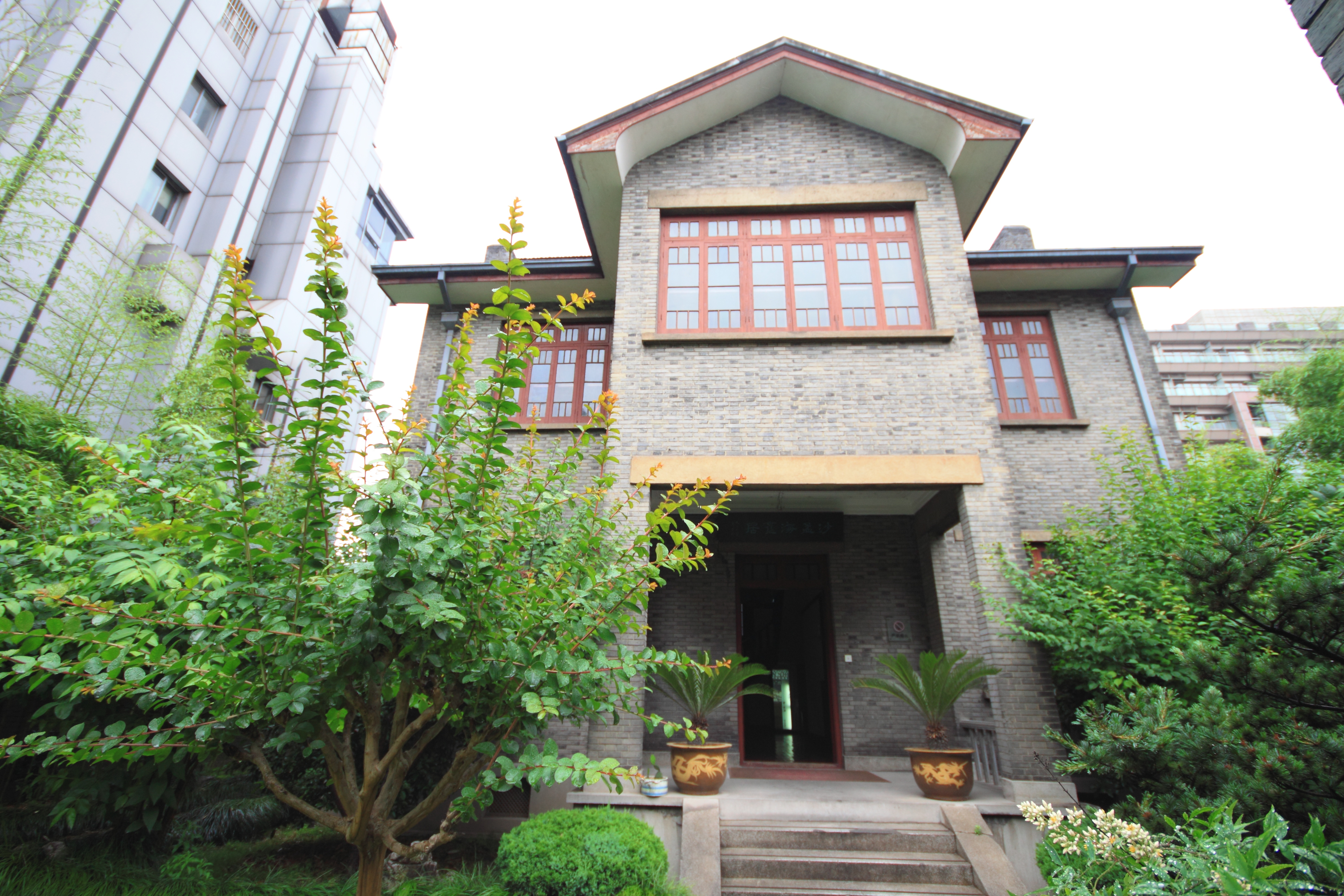
Former Residence of Sha Menghai in Hangzhou

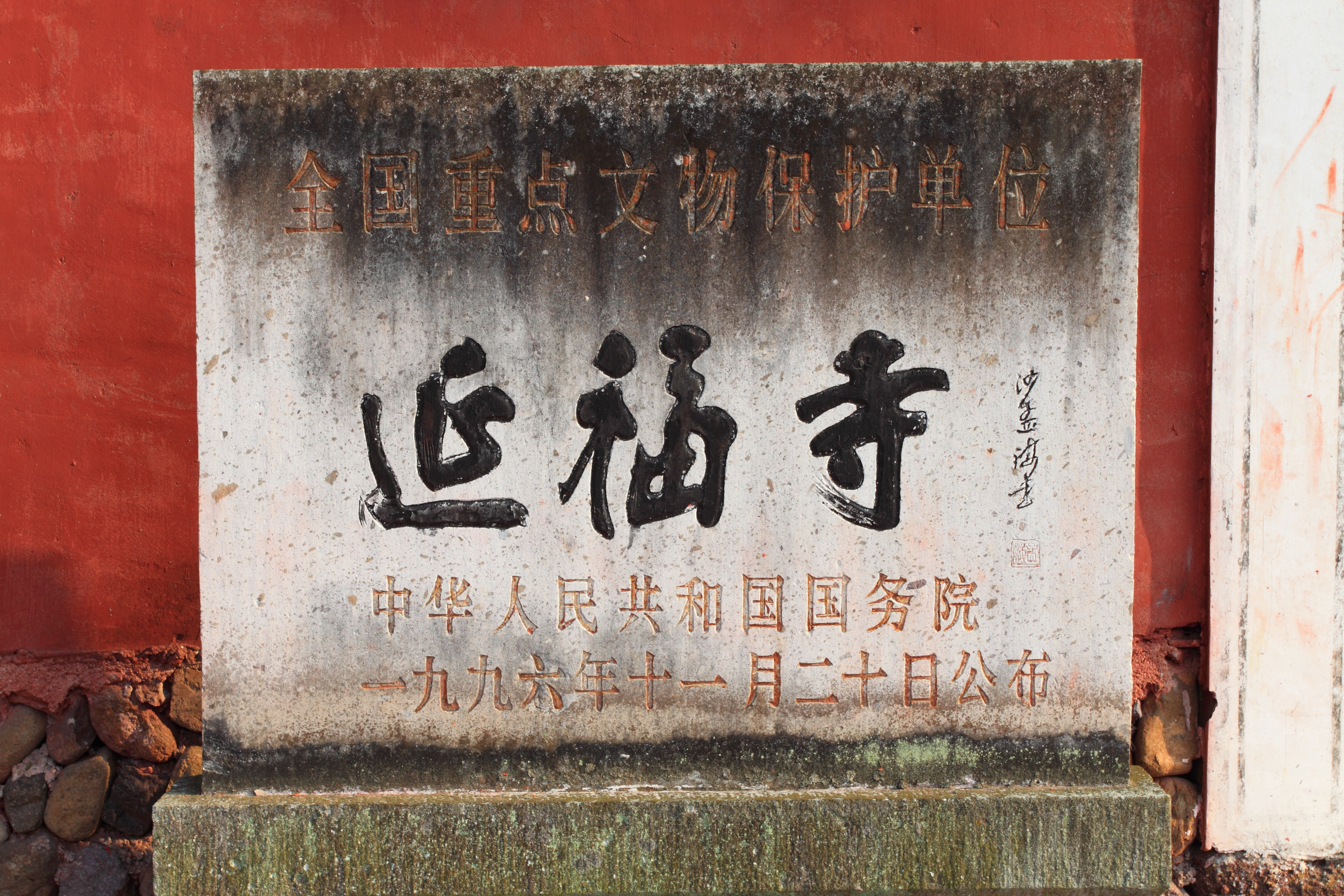
calligraphy of Sha Menghai

Sha Menghai (Chinese: 沙孟海; pinyin: Shā Mènghǎi, June 11, 1900 – October 10, 1992), born Shi Wenruo (沙文若), was a great master of calligraphy in China. He also was a master of Chinese seal carving (中国篆刻艺术), a theoretician of traditional Chinese art, and a master of Shanghai School art. Sha Wenhan is his brother and they both were oncles of the modern painter, Sha Qi (沙耆; 1914–2005), also known as "Sadji".

Sha was born in Sha village in Yinxian, Zhejiang. He was a professor in National Zhongshan University (from 1929), National Zhejiang University (from 1949), and China Academy of Art (from 1963).
