= Febrifugine =

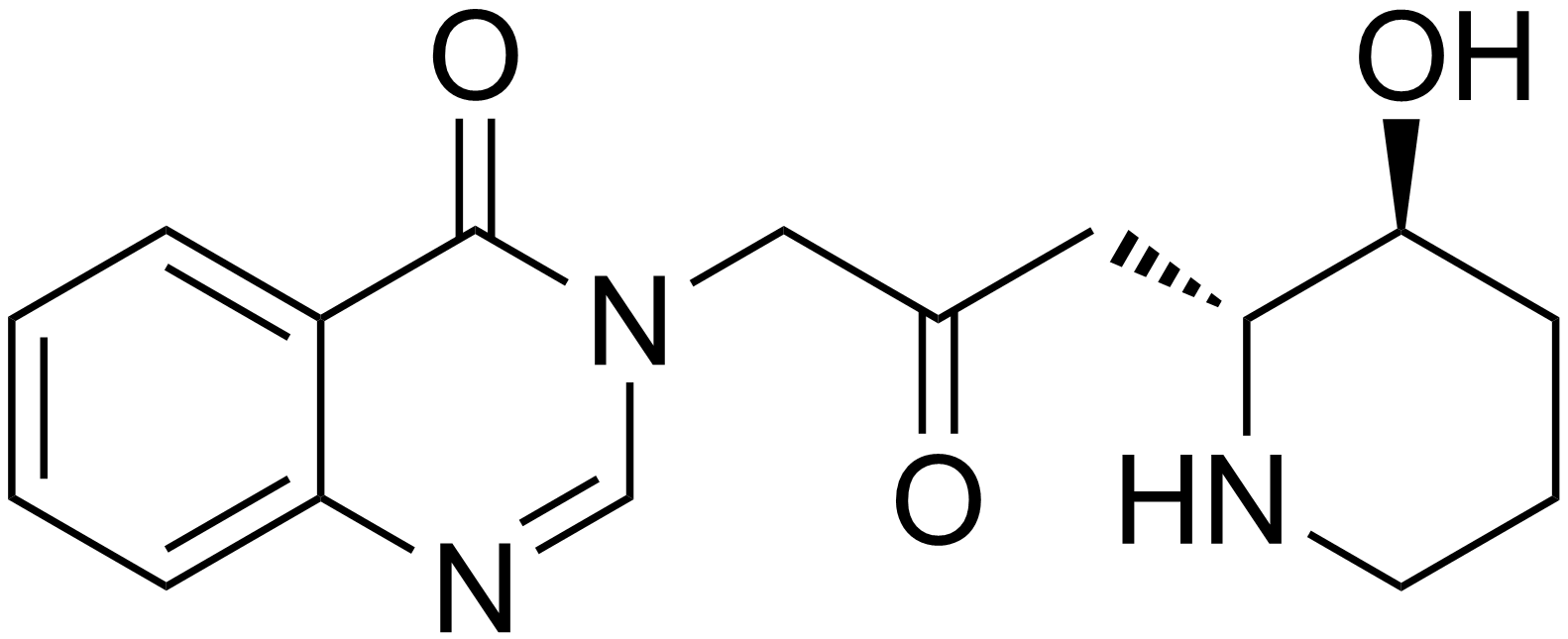

Names
- IUPAC name 3-{3-[(2R,3S)-3-Hydroxypiperidin-2-yl]-2-oxopropyl}quinazolin-4(3H)-one

Identifiers
| CAS Number | 24159-07-7 |
| 3D model (JSmol) | Interactive image |
| ChEMBL | ChEMBL479432 |
| ChemSpider | 8027405 |
| ECHA InfoCard | 100.208.679 |
| PubChem CID | 9851692 |
| UNII | 89UWD0FH2I |
| CompTox Dashboard (EPA) | DTXSID30946987 |
- InChI: InChI=1S/C16H19N3O3/c20-11(8-14-15(21)6-3-7-17-14)9-19-10-18-13-5-2-1-4-12(13)16(19)22/h1-2,4-5,10,14-15,17,21H,3,6-9H2/t14-,15+/m1/s1 Key: FWVHWDSCPKXMDB-CABCVRRESA-N
- SMILES: C1C[C@@H]([C@H](NC1)CC(=O)CN2C=NC3=CC=CC=C3C2=O)O

Properties
| Chemical formula | C_{16}H_{19}N_{3}O_{3} |
| Molar mass | 301.346 g·mol^{−1} |
- Except where otherwise noted, data are given for materials in their standard state (at 25 °C [77 °F], 100 kPa). verify (what is ?) Infobox references

Febrifugine is a quinazolinone alkaloid first isolated from the Chinese herb Dichroa febrifuga, but also found in the garden plant Hydrangea. Laboratory synthesis of febrifugine determined that the originally reported stereochemistry was incorrect.

Febrifugine has antimalarial properties and the synthetic halogenated derivative halofuginone is used in veterinary medicine as a coccidiostat. Other synthetic febrifugine derivatives have been used against malaria, cancer, fibrosis, and inflammatory disease.
