= Artemether =

Chemical compound

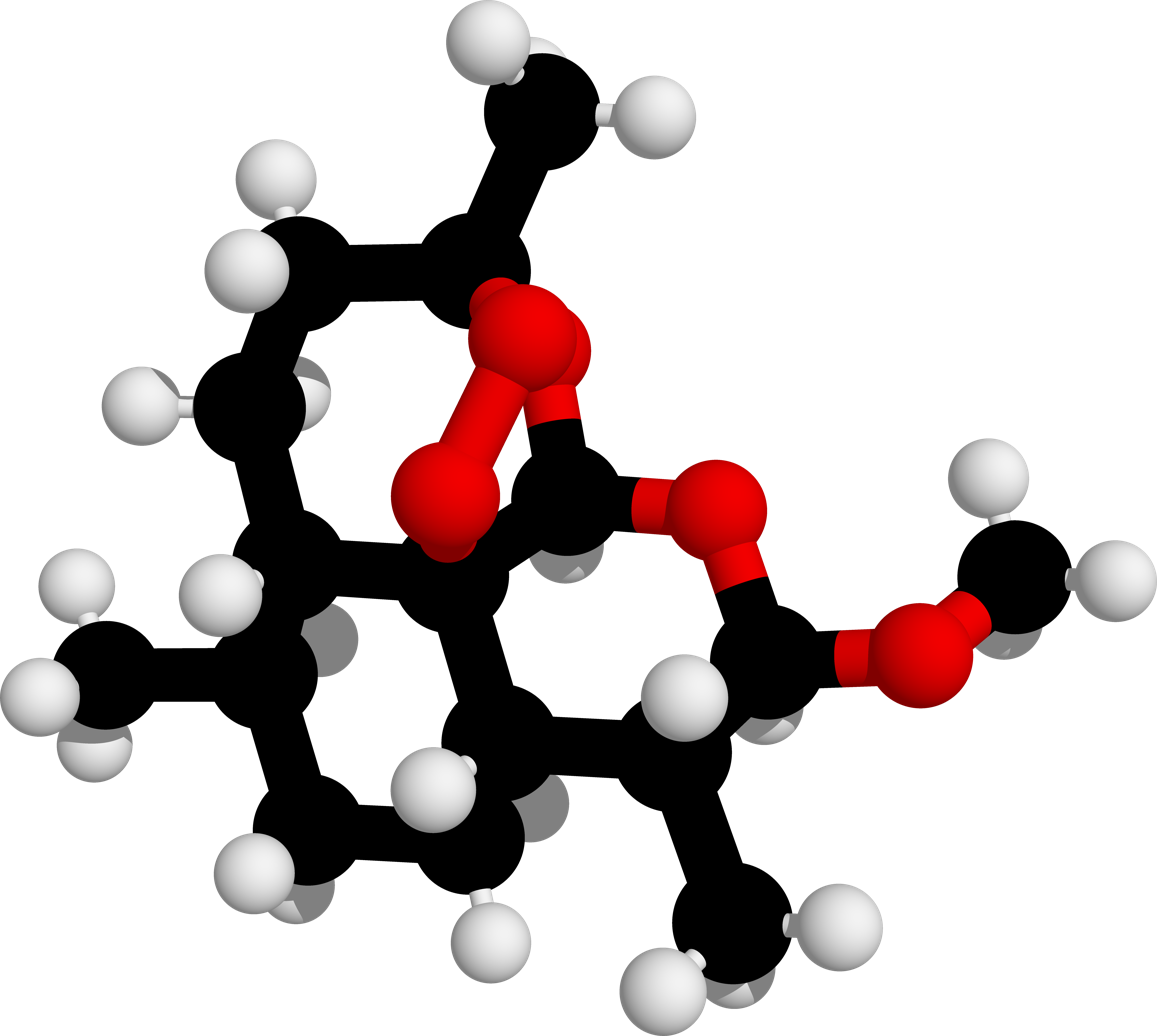

Clinical data
- Trade names: Many
- AHFS/Drugs.com: International Drug Names
- Routes of administration: Intramuscular Oral
- ATC code: P01BE02 (WHO)

Legal status
- Legal status: UK: POM (Prescription only); In general: ℞ (Prescription only)

Identifiers
- IUPAC name: (3R,5aS,6R,8aS,9R,10S,12R,12aR)-10-methoxy-3,6,9-trimethyldecahydro-12H-3,12-epoxy[1,2]dioxepino[4,3-i]-2-benzopyran
- CAS Number: 71963-77-4
- PubChem CID: 68911
- DrugBank: DB06697
- ChemSpider: 62138
- UNII: C7D6T3H22J
- KEGG: D02483
- ChEBI: CHEBI:195280
- PDB ligand: D8Z (PDBe, RCSB PDB)
- CompTox Dashboard (EPA): DTXSID7040651
- ECHA InfoCard: 100.189.847

Chemical and physical data
- Formula: C_{16}H_{26}O_{5}
- Molar mass: 298.379 g·mol^{−1}
- 3D model (JSmol): Interactive image
- Melting point: 86 to 88 °C (187 to 190 °F)
- SMILES: C[C@@H]1CC[C@@H]3C42OO[C@](C)(CC[C@@H]12)O[C@H]4O[C@H](OC)[C@@H]3C
- InChI: InChI=1S/C16H26O5/c1-9-5-6-12-10(2)13(17-4)18-14-16(12)11(9)7-8-15(3,19-14)20-21-16/h9-14H,5-8H2,1-4H3/t9-,10-,11+,12+,13+,14-,15-,16-/m1/s1; Key:SXYIRMFQILZOAM-HVNFFKDJSA-N

Artemether is a medication used for the treatment of malaria. The injectable form is specifically used for severe malaria rather than quinine. In adults, it may not be as effective as artesunate. It is given by injection in a muscle. It is also available by mouth in combination with lumefantrine, known as artemether/lumefantrine.

Artemether causes relatively few side effects. An irregular heartbeat may rarely occur. While there is evidence that use during pregnancy may be harmful in animals, there is no evidence of concern in humans. The World Health Organization (WHO) therefore recommends its use during pregnancy. It is in the artemisinin class of medication.

Artemether has been studied since at least 1981, and has been in medical use since 1987. It is on the World Health Organization's List of Essential Medicines.

== Medical uses ==
Artemether is an antimalarial drug for uncomplicated malaria caused by P. falciparum (and chloroquine-resistant P. falciparum) or chloroquine-resistant P. vivax parasites. Artemether can also be used to treat severe malaria.

The World Health Organization (WHO) recommends the treatment of uncomplicated P. falciparum with artemisinin-based combination therapy. Given in combination with lumefantrine, it may be followed by a 14-day regimen of primaquine to prevent relapse of P. vivax or P. ovale malarial parasites and provide a complete cure.

Artemether can also be used in treating and preventing trematode infections of schistosomiasis when used in combination with praziquantel.

Artemether is rated category C by the FDA based on animal studies where artemisinin derivatives have shown an association with fetal loss and deformity. Some studies, however, do not show evidence of harm.

== Side effects ==
Possible side effects include cardiac effects such as bradycardia and QT interval prolongation. Also, possible central nervous system toxicity has been shown in animal studies.

== Drug interactions ==
Plasma artemether level was found to be lower when the combination product was used with lopinavir/ritonavir. There is also decreased drug exposure associated with concurrent use with efavirenz or nevirapine.

Artemether/lumefantrine should not be used with drugs that inhibit CYP3A4.

Hormonal contraceptives may not be as efficacious when used with artemether/lumefantrine.

== Pharmacology ==
=== Mechanism of action ===
A possible mechanism of action is that artemisinin drugs exert their cidal action by inhibiting PfATP6. Since PfATP6 is an enzyme regulating cellular calcium concentration, its malfunctioning will lead to intracellular calcium accumulation, which in turns causes cell death.

=== Pharmacokinetics ===
Absorption of artemether is improved 2- to 3-fold with food. It is highly bound to protein (95.4%). Peak concentrations of artemether are seen 2 hours after administration.

Artemether is metabolized in the human body to the active metabolite, dihydroartemisinin, primarily by hepatic enzymes CYP3A4/5. Both the parent drug and active metabolite are eliminated with a half-life of about 2 hours.

== Chemistry ==
Artemether is a methyl ether derivative of artemisinin, which is a peroxide-containing lactone isolated from the antimalarial plant Artemisia annua. It is also known as dihydroartemisinin methyl ether, but its correct chemical nomenclature is (+)-(3α,5aβ,6β,8aβ,9α,12β,12aR)-decahydro-10-methoxy-3,6,9-trimethyl-3,12-epoxy-12H-pyrano[4,3-j]-1,2-benzodioxepine. It is a relatively lipophilic and unstable drug, which acts by creating reactive free radicals in addition to affecting the membrane transport system of the plasmodium organism.
