= Ganaplacide =

Experimental antimalarial

Clinical data
- Other names: GNF-156, KAF156, Ganaplacide
- ATC code: None

Legal status
- Legal status: Investigational

Identifiers
- IUPAC name: 2-Amino-1-{2-(4-fluorophenyl)-3-[(4-fluorophenyl)amino]-8,8-dimethyl-5,6-dihydroimidazo[1,2-a]pyrazin-7(8H)-yl}ethanone
- CAS Number: 1261113-96-5
- PubChem CID: 49856296
- ChemSpider: 28512871
- UNII: 85VMN9JU7A
- ChEMBL: ChEMBL2058833
- CompTox Dashboard (EPA): DTXSID701105307

Chemical and physical data
- Formula: C_{22}H_{23}F_{2}N_{5}O
- Molar mass: 411.457 g·mol^{−1}
- 3D model (JSmol): Interactive image
- SMILES: CC1(c2nc(c(n2CCN1C(=O)CN)Nc3ccc(cc3)F)c4ccc(cc4)F)C
- InChI: InChI=1S/C22H23F2N5O/c1-22(2)21-27-19(14-3-5-15(23)6-4-14)20(26-17-9-7-16(24)8-10-17)28(21)11-12-29(22)18(30)13-25/h3-10,26H,11-13,25H2,1-2H3; Key:BUPRVECGWBHCQV-UHFFFAOYSA-N

Ganaplacide (development codename KAF156) is a drug in development by Novartis for the purpose of treating malaria. It is a imidazolopiperazine derivative. It has shown activity against the Plasmodium falciparum and Plasmodium vivax forms of the malaria parasite.

== Clinical development ==
The antimalarial activity of the imidazolopiperazine compound class was initially discovered through a series of sensitive phenotypic antimalarial screens that were developed and run in 2007 and 2008 by a group of biologists working at the Genomics Institute of the Novartis Research Foundation and the Scripps Research Institute. The lead product was published in 2012 as a leader of the imidazolopiperazine class. This was followed by studies in animal models published in 2014. Preclinical studies found no significant in vitro safety liabilities. A Phase 1 study found some gastrointestinal and neurological effects but these were self-limited in 70 healthy males and established dosing for a future Phase 2 Trial.

The just completed Phase 2 Trial was completed with 4 study locations in Thailand and one study location in Vietnam. This study looked at the effect of 400 mg given daily for 3 days as well as a single 800 mg dose. In the 21 Patients who received a single 800 mg dose 67% of patients cleared the infection which is comparable to other antimalarial medications. More than half of the patients had some reported adverse event and the rate was higher in patients who received a single 800 mg dose over patients who received 3 400 mg doses. The most common effect was asymptomatic bradycardia where patients heart rates fell below 60 Beats Per Minute. Other reported events include hypokalemia, elevated liver enzymes as well as anemia.

== Pharmacology ==
The mechanism of this drug is currently unknown. Resistance is conferred by mutations in PfCARL, a protein with 7 transmembrane domains, as well as by mutations in the P. falciparum acetyl-CoA transporter and the UDP-galactose transporter. None of these are thought to be the target of ganaplacide. Initial functional studies were performed with the closely related chemotype, GNF179 that differs from the clinical candidate by a single halogen.

== Society and culture ==
=== Economics ===
Novartis is an international drug company based in Switzerland and is developing ganaplacide as a drug for the treatment of malaria. This drug was identified by a high throughput screen of over 2 million compounds. This drug is being developed with support from the Bill and Melinda Gates foundation via their Medicine for Malaria Venture. It will also be a part of the Novartis Malaria Initiative which has been providing 750 million treatments without producing any profit for the larger company.

=== Intellectual property ===
Ganaplacide is protected by the granted United States Patent 9,469,645.
