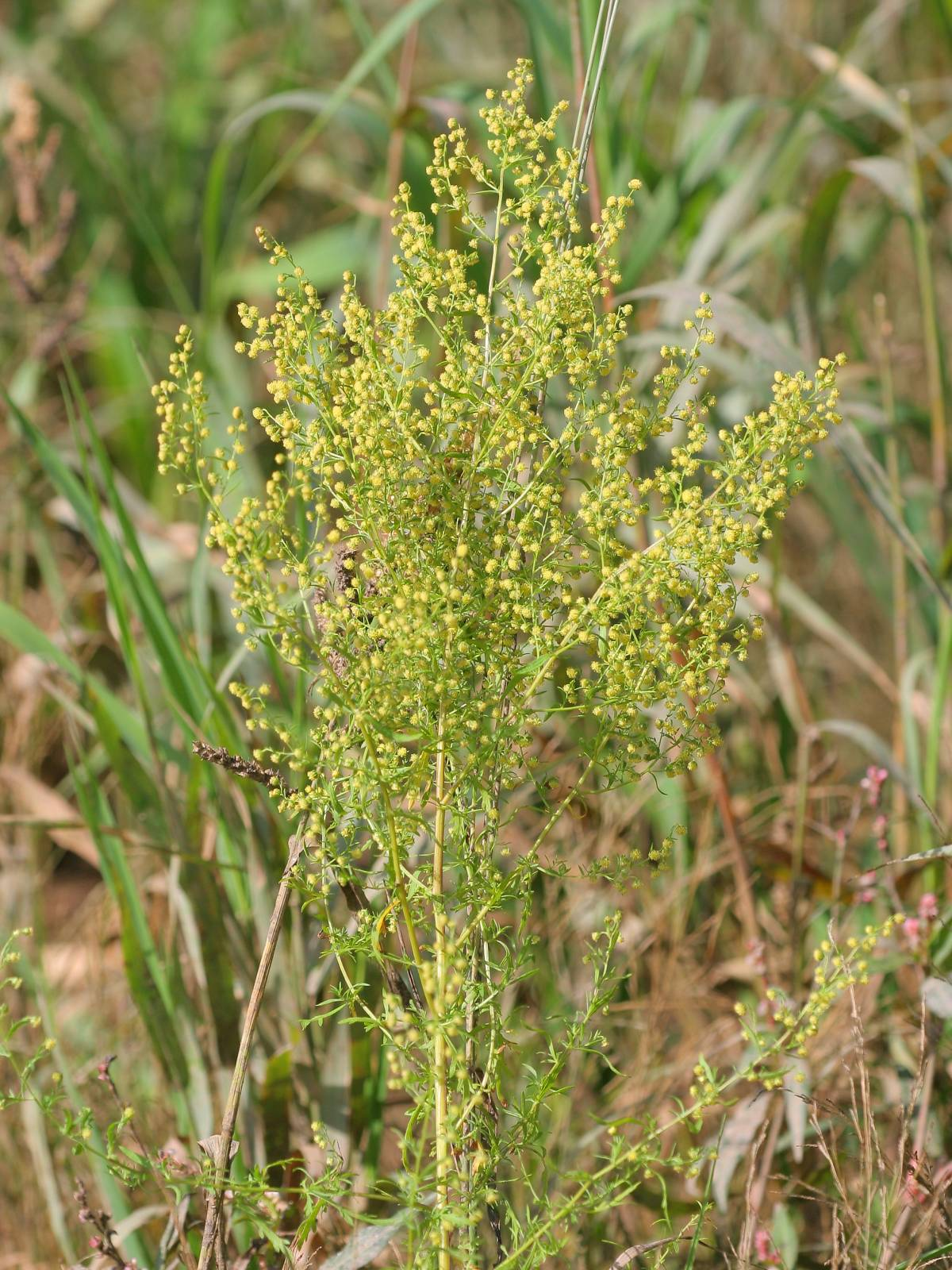

Scientific classification
- Kingdom: Plantae
- Clade: Embryophytes
- Clade: Tracheophytes
- Clade: Angiosperms
- Clade: Eudicots
- Clade: Asterids
- Order: Asterales
- Family: Asteraceae
- Genus: Artemisia
- Species: A. annua

Binomial name
- Artemisia annua L.

Synonyms
- Artemisia chamomilla C.Winkl.

= Artemisia annua =

Herb known as sweet wormwood

Artemisia annua, also known as sweet wormwood, sweet annie, sweet sagewort, annual mugwort or annual wormwood, is a common type of wormwood native to temperate Asia, but naturalized in many countries including scattered parts of North America.

The chemical compound artemisinin, which is isolated from A. annua, is a medication used to treat malaria due to Plasmodium falciparum, the deadliest species of malarial parasite. Discovery of artemisinin and its antimalarial properties made the Chinese scientist Tu Youyou recipient of the 2011 Lasker Prize and 2015 Nobel Prize in Physiology or Medicine.

== Description ==
Artemisia annua belongs to the plant family of Asteraceae and is an annual short-day plant. Its stem is erect and brownish or violet-brown. The plant itself is hairless and naturally grows from 30 to 100 cm tall, although in cultivation plants can reach a height of 200 cm. The leaves of A. annua have a length of 3–5 cm and are divided by deep cuts into two or three small leaflets. The intensive aromatic scent of the leaves is characteristic. The artemisinin content in dried leaves is in between 0% and 1.5%. New hybrids of A. annua developed in Switzerland can reach a leaf artemisinin content of up to 2%. Also, four new genotypes developed by a collaboration between the USDA and Purdue University with 2% leaf artemisinin were released for researchers involved in the production of artemisinin. The small flowers have a diameter of 2–2.5 mm and are arranged in loose panicles. Their color is greenish-yellow. The seeds are brown achenes with a diameter of only 0.6–0.8 mm. Their thousand-kernel weight (TKW) averages around 0.03 g (in comparison, wheat has a TKW of approximately 45 g).

== Agricultural practice ==
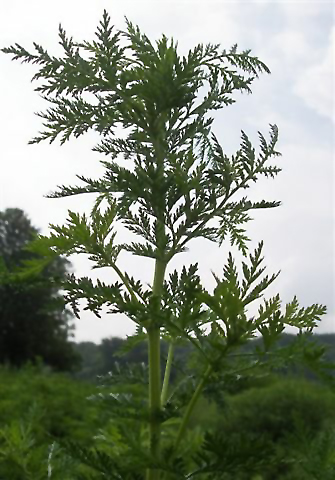
Artemisia annua

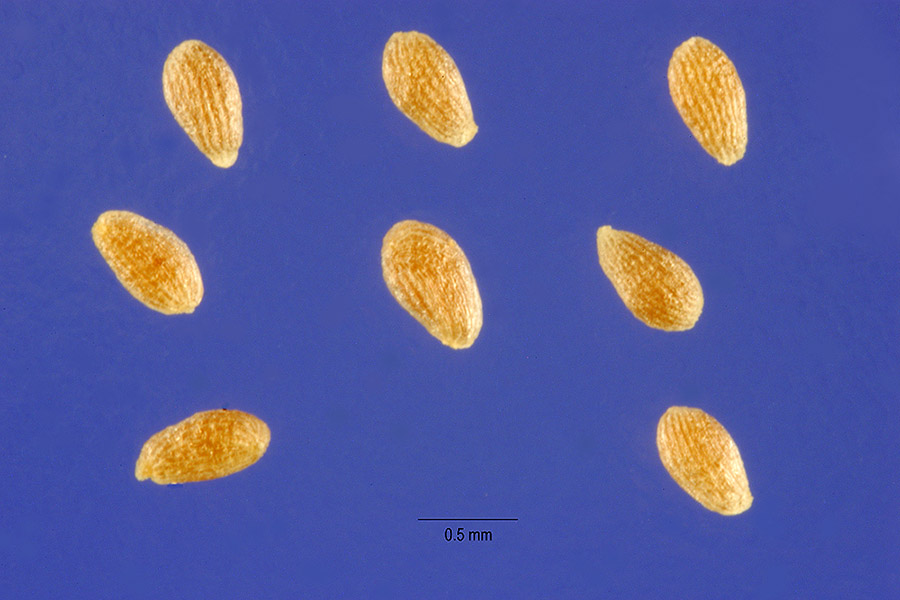
Seeds

The growing period of A. annua from seeding through to harvest is 190–240 days, depending on the climate and altitude of the production area. The plant is harvested at the beginning of flowering when the artemisinin content is highest. Dry leaf yields of A. annua plantations vary between 0.5 and 3 tonnes per hectare.

Growth Phases	Days after sowing
Seed germination	4–10
Appearance of 1st pair of leaves	15–30
Appearance of 2nd pair of leaves	21–50
Branching	60–90
Cessation of growth in height	170–200
Flowering	190–240
Full fruition	230–280
Withering	260–310

In terms of the climate A. annua prefers sunny and warm conditions. Its optimal growth temperature lies between 20 and 25 °C. Annual temperature sums of 3500–5000 °C (sum of temperatures higher than 10 °C over one year) are required to guarantee a proper maturing. The rainfall during the growing season should not be less than 600 mm (annual rainfall higher than 1150 mm). Especially the seedlings of A. annua. are susceptible to drought or water logging. The mature plants on the other hand are quite resistant to those climate conditions. Nevertheless, the preferred soil conditions for A. annua are light soils with deep topsoils and good drainage properties. But it is reported, that the plant is adaptable to different soil types. Paired with the relatively low demand on the environment A. annua can have characteristics of a neophytic plant.

A. annua is best sown in rows to facilitate the removal of weeds, which has to be done mechanically or manually because herbicides are typically not used. It is recommended to sow 1.4 – 2 seeds per square meter. The fertilizer requirements are at a low level. Potassium should be used as base fertilizer. It is taken up by the plant during the whole growing season. Nitrogen is required during early branching stages, an amount of approximately 70 kg N/ha is sufficient for the plant. Phosphate on the other hand is required during the blooming stages. Phosphate fertilization can lead to a higher artemisinin content in the leaves. The application of salicylic acid to the leaves shortly before harvesting the plant also can raise its artemisinin content. Besides few viral diseases, A. annua has no major diseases that need to be controlled.

The harvest of the plant is best done when plants reach peak artemisinin, which may be in the state of flower budding, for early-flowering cultivars. However, for late flowering cultivars that were reported to reach peak artemisinin in early September in the United States, the harvest will happen about a month before the flowering stage when plants produce more artemisinin in leaves. This peak artemisinin in early September was observed for Brazilian, Chinese, and Swiss clones in West Virginia. Drying the plants before extraction will significantly increase artemisinin as dihydroartemisinic acid and artemisinic acid seem to be converted into artemisinin. The whole plant is harvested and cut into branches which are dried in the sun or an oven. Some report that drying artemisia plants at 45 °C for 24h increased artemisinin and maintained leaf antioxidant capacity. The dry branches are shaken or beaten to separate the leaves from the stem. The leaves are then packed into fabric bags and shipped for further processing. The optimum storage conditions are either 20 °C with 85% relative humidity (RH) or 30 °C with 30–40% RH.

== Artemisinin and other phytochemicals ==
In 1971, scientists demonstrated that the plant extracts had antimalarial activity in primate models, and in 1972 the active ingredient, artemisinin (formerly referred to as arteannuin), was isolated and its chemical structure described. Artemisinin may be extracted using a low-boiling-point solvent, such as diethylether, is found in the glandular trichomes of the leaves, stems, and inflorescences, and is concentrated in the upper portions of plants within new growth.

The first isolation of artemisinin from the herb occurred from a military project known as Project 523, following the study of traditional medicine pharmacopoeias performed by Tu Youyou and other researchers within the project. A. annua contains diverse phytochemicals, including polyphenols such as coumarins, flavones, flavonols, and phenolic acids which have unknown biological properties in vivo. Other phytochemicals include 38 sesquiterpenes. Dihydroartemisinin is the active metabolite of artemisinin, and artesunate is a water-soluble derivative of artemisinin. Recent research conducted in China and Korea has also demonstrated the presence of several nene, present in the essential oil.

== Malaria treatment ==
Research to develop antimalarial drugs led to the discovery of artemisinin in the 1970s by the Chinese scientist Tu Youyou, who shared the 2015 Nobel Prize in Physiology or Medicine. An improved extract was obtained by using a low-temperature ether-based extraction method, further showing the artemisinin derivative artemether to be an effective antimalarial drug.

Artemisinin is a sesquiterpene lactone with an endoperoxide bridge and has been produced as an antimalarial drug. The efficacy of tea, made with either water or urine and A. annua, for the treatment of malaria is dubious, and is discouraged by the World Health Organization (WHO). Research has found that artemisinin is not soluble in water and the concentrations in these infusions are considered insufficient to treat malaria. A 2012 review stated that artemisinin-based remedies are the most effective drugs for the treatment of malaria. A 2013 review suggested that although A. annua may not cause hepatotoxicity, haematotoxicity, or hyperlipidemia, it should be used cautiously during pregnancy owing to a potential risk of embryotoxicity at a high dose.

The WHO has approved riamet (Coartem), a combination of lumefantrine (120 mg) and artemether (an artemisinin derivative extracted with ether, 20 mg) in repeat treatments over two days, producing efficacy of up to 98% against malaria.

=== Mechanism ===
The proposed mechanism of action of artemisinin involves cleavage of endoperoxide bridges by iron, producing free radicals (hypervalent iron-oxo species, epoxides, aldehydes, and dicarbonyl compounds) which damage biological macromolecules causing oxidative stress in the cells of the malaria parasite. Malaria is caused by apicomplexans, primarily Plasmodium falciparum, which largely reside in red blood cells and contain iron-rich heme-groups (in the form of hemozoin). In 2015, artemisinin was shown to bind to a large number of cell targets, indicating its potential for diverse effects.

=== Artemisinin resistance ===
Despite global efforts in combating malaria, it remains a large burden for the population, particularly in tropical and subtropical regions. As of 2013, it seems that the pathogenic agent of malaria is becoming resistant to artemisinin-based drugs. Emergence of artemisinin resistance has been identified in Cambodia and the border of Thailand. Although the WHO recommends artemisinin-based remedies for treating uncomplicated malaria, artemisinin resistance has become a concern. The causes that affected the emergence of artemisinin resistance include the use of artemisinin-based remedies. Encouraging herbal alternatives are in the pipeline, but a more dependable solution for the eradication of malaria would be the creation of an effective vaccination. Resistance will likely spread to other endemic areas across the world.

== Traditional medicine ==
In traditional Chinese medicine (TCM), A. annua is prepared with water to treat fever. Owing to duplication in ancient TCM sources, A. annua is more commonly referred to as qinghao (Chinese: 青蒿; pinyin: qīnghāo), the modern Chinese name for Artemisia carvifolia, as opposed to its current Chinese name huanghuahao.
