= Guru Prakash Dutta =

Indian cell biologist and immunologist (1933–2021)

Dr. Guru Prakash Dutta
- Born: 19 November 1933; India
- Died: 25 April 2021 (aged 87)
- Education: Punjab University
- Known for: Experimental Protozoology; Immunology
- Awards: 1976 Shanti Swarup Bhatnagar Prize
- Scientific career
- Fields: Cell biology
- Workplaces: Punjab University; Central Drug Research Institute

Guru Prakash Dutta (19 November 1933 - 25 April 2021) was an Indian cell biologist and immunologist, known for his contributions to the subjects of Experimental protozoology and Immunology. His researches are reported to have assisted in the development of a number of anti-malarial drugs. He was an elected fellow of the Indian National Science Academy, National Academy of Sciences, India and Indian Society of Parasitology. The Council of Scientific and Industrial Research, the apex agency of the Government of India for scientific research, awarded him the Shanti Swarup Bhatnagar Prize for Science and Technology, one of the highest Indian science awards, in 1976, for his contributions to biological sciences.

== Biography ==
Guru Prakash Dutta, after graduating in zoology in 1952 from DAV College, Jallandhar of Punjab University, followed it up with an honors degree in 1955, a master's degree (MSc) in 1956 and a doctoral degree (PhD) in 1961 from the same institution. He started his career as a lecturer at his alma mater in 1962 where he stayed till his move to Central Drug Research Institute (CDRI) in 1964; in between, he had a stint at National Institutes of Health, Bethesda as a post-doctoral fellow during 1962–63. He served CDRI for more than three decades and was a director's grade scientist at the time of his superannuation in 1993. Post his retirement, he served as an emeritus scientist of the Council of Scientific and Industrial Research at CDRI from 1994 to 1998 and as an honorary consultant on Malaria at the Central Institute of Medicinal and Aromatic Plants from 1998 to 2000.

Dutta, whose researches on experimental protozoology assisted in a wider understanding of protozoa and its functional morphology, is known to have developed new techniques for the culture of those unicellular eukaryotic organisms and studied their metabolic and growth responses to physico-chemical factors, with special emphasis on Entamoeba histolytica, an anaerobic parasite which causes amoebiasis. His work on the antimalarial drugs helped in the development of several fast-acting drugs and alpha/beta arteether, alpha and beta arteether, alpha and beta artelinate, dihydroartemisinin, pyronaridine, bulaquine and Tefenoquine are some of drugs developed with the assistance of his researches. (Note: It is reported that 30 patents have been granted for drugs based on Dutta's researches.)

Dutta's researches have been detailed in over 275 articles and two books, Antimalarial Drug Development and Prophylaxis against Malaria and Experimental and Clinical Studies on Amoebiasis. The International Review of Cytology of Academic Press has published five reviews, three on Cytochemistry and ultrastructure of Protozoa and two on Amoebiasis and ResearchGate, an online repository of scientific articles, has listed 130 of his papers. He has been a collaborator for Walter Reed Army Institute of Research in two of their international programs on Malaria which ran between 1983 and 1994. He has also mentored 40 master's and doctoral scholars in their researches.

Dutta received the degree of Doctor of Science from the Punjab University in 1973 and the Council of Scientific and Industrial Research awarded him the Shanti Swarup Bhatnagar Prize, one of the highest Indian science awards, for his contributions to biological sciences in 1976. The Indian National Science Academy elected him as their fellow in 1984 and the National Academy of Sciences, India followed INSA with their fellowship in 1991. He was also elected by the Indian Society for Parasitology as a fellow in 1993.

== See also ==
- Central Drug Research Institute
- Central Institute of Medicinal and Aromatic Plants
- Walter Reed Army Institute of Research
