= Sunil Kumar Verma =

Indian scientist (born 1974)

- Verma in November 2014
- Born: 28 September 1974; Tikri, Uttar Pradesh, India
- Died: 31 May 2021 (aged 46); Hyderabad, India
- Education: D.Phil. in medical oncology
- Alma mater: University of Oxford
- Known for: Universal primer technology for wildlife identification
- Awards: IAFS Award (1999); Commonwealth Scholarship (2003); CSIR Technology Award (2008); BioAsia Innovation Award (2009); NRDC Award-2009
- Scientific career
- Fields: Molecular biology; Wildlife forensics
- Workplaces: G. B. Pant University, Pantnagar; CDFD; CCMB; University of Oxford; Cancer Research UK; London Research Institute
- Doctoral advisor: T. S. Ganesan; Peter J. Parker

Sunil Kumar Verma (28 September 1974 – 31 May 2021), was an Indian biologist and a principal scientist at the Centre for Cellular and Molecular Biology, Hyderabad, India. Verma was primarily known for his contributions to the development of "universal primer technology", a first generation DNA barcoding method, that can identify any bird, fish, reptile or mammal from a small biological sample, and satisfy legal evidence requirements in a court of law. This technology has revitalised the field of wildlife forensics and is now routinely used across India to provide a species identification service in cases of wildlife crime. This approach of species identification is now known as "DNA barcoding" across the world.

Verma received his D.Phil. in medical oncology from the University of Oxford, and had worked in the areas of signal transduction in cancer and on molecular biology applications in wildlife conservation. He was the recipient of several national awards, including the 2008 CSIR Technology Award, the 2009 NRDC Meritorious Invention Award and the 2009 BioAsia Innovation Award in recognition of his contribution to Indian science and technology. He died on May 31, 2021, due to COVID-19 pneumonia.

== Education and research career ==
=== Early life and education ===
Verma was born in a small village in the northern Indian state of Uttar Pradesh. Verma grew up primarily in Tikri and up to the twelfth standard studied at the government school in Tikri. After completing his twelfth standard in the science group from this school in 1991, he attended the G. B. Pant University of Agriculture and Technology, Pantnagar to complete his Bachelor of Science in agriculture and animal husbandry.

=== Research career ===
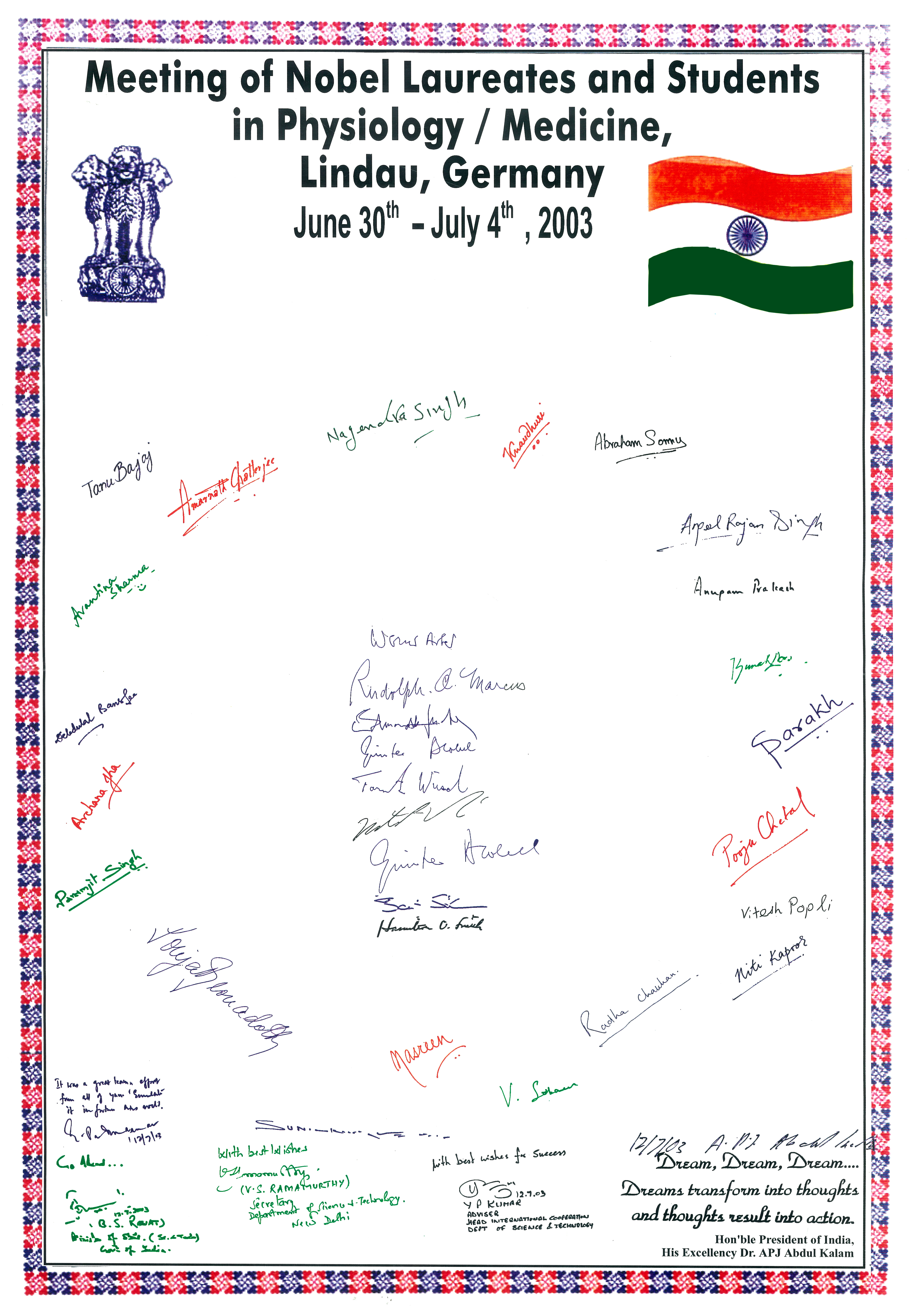
Lindau Nobel Laureates Meet 2003 – Memorabilia and Honor: Signed by – nine Nobel Laureates (center), Indian delegation of scholars (periphery) and President of India A. P. J. Abdul Kalam (bottom right). Verma attended the meeting and signed the document (bottom middle).

Verma started his research career at G. B. Pant University of Agriculture and Technology, Pantnagar, where he worked on the DNA fingerprinting of Indian scented basmati rice for identification of duplicate accessions. In 1998, Verma was appointed as a scientist at the Centre for DNA Fingerprinting and Diagnostics (CDFD) where he continued his research on the DNA-based identification system, and in 1999, he received the Emerging Forensic Scientist Continental Award from the International Association of Forensic Sciences at the University of California, USA for his work on DNA microsatellite based identification of wild animals.

In 2000, Verma was appointed as a scientist at the Centre for Cellular and Molecular Biology, where in 2001, he and Lalji Singh invented universal primer technology for wildlife identification, for which he later received a number of international patents, and several national awards including the CSIR Technology Award in 2008 (jointly conferred to Verma and Lalji Singh), the 2009 NRDC Award (jointly conferred on Verma and Singh) and the BioAsia Innovation Award in 2009.

In 2003, Verma received a Lindau Fellowship to represent Indian scholars at the Lindau Nobel Laureate Meetings in physiology and medicine. During the same year, he also received a Commonwealth Scholarship to carry out his doctoral studies at the University of Oxford. Verma completed his D.Phil. in medical oncology at the University of Oxford in 2007, and in January 2008 returned to India to continue his work at the CCMB. In 2010, he subsequently became principal scientist at the CCMB and as of January 2015, he remains in that position.

Verma was a visiting fellow at the Max Planck Institute for Infection Biology during 2010–2013. Starting in 2010, as of January 2015 he is a research ambassador for the DAAD to promote bidirectional research collaboration between India and Germany.

Along with his team, Verma's research in the area of wildlife conservation led to the reclassification of the pygmy hog, an endangered endemic species, from Sus salvanius to Porcula salvania

==== 2015 Nobel Prize Controversy ====
Chemical structures of arthemisin and arthemisinin. Chemically, both of these belong to a group of chemicals known as Sesquiterpene lactones.

In 2015 Verma claimed that the malaria treatment drug artemisinin (initially extracted from Artemisia annua, later synthesized), the discovery of which earned Chinese scientist Tu Youyou the Lasker Award in 2011 and the Nobel Prize in Physiology or Medicine in 2015, has roots in older traditional medicine from India under the name artemisin, associated with a related Indian plant species (Hindi: Ajwain) and previously identified as fever-treating. Verma argued that in order to fairly implement the provisions of Article 10 of Nagoya Protocol on equitable sharing of benefits derived from the utilization of genetic resources and traditional knowledge associated with the genetic resources (such as a plant-based medicine that arises based on the traditional knowledge on the usage of the specific plant or closely related plant species), no single person or country must be allowed to take credit for a genetic resource, or associated traditional knowledge if that previously existed in many countries, merely due to absence of proper documentation, or the inability of a specific country to claim rights on its traditional knowledge due to various reasons such as absence of legal framework.

== Universal primer technology ==
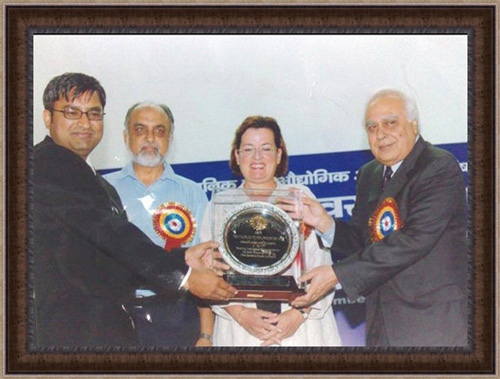
Sunil Kumar Verma receiving the CSIR Technology Award from the Minister of Science & Technology, Government of India for his contributions to the development of universal primer technology for wildlife identification

In March 2001, Verma and Lalji Singh claimed to have invented a method that they called "universal primer technology", which allowed the identification of any unknown biological sample and its assignment to a known species source.

Through its ability to work across a large range of animal species, universal primer technology can identify any bird, fish, reptile or mammal and satisfy legal evidence requirements in a court of law. Patents relating to this invention have been filed in several countries and the research papers published in various journals. This technique of CSIR-CCMB revitalised the field of wildlife forensics. It is currently being used routinely in LaCONES at the CSIR-CCMB to provide a wildlife forensics service across India in cases pertaining to wildlife crime.

Verma's and Singh's contribution to the development of universal primer technology has been recognised by the Indian minister of Science and Technology and the Ministry of Earth Sciences in a written report to the Lok Sabha.

Universal primer technology was also used by Therion International, an independent animal testing lab in New York, to uncover the noted seafood scandal in Florida and other parts of America. Several undercover investigations carried out by the ABC7 Whistleblower and WKRG News5 investigators, revealed that almost half of the seafood was inaccurately labelled as a more expensive variety. This method of species identification used by the Therion International to uncover the seafood scam, was cited as "gold standard" by various labs worldwide.

=== Universal primer technology and DNA barcoding ===
In February 2015, a credit dispute between universal primer technology and DNA barcoding came to light. Verma has argued that DNA barcoding, a technique independently described by zoologist Paul D N Hebert in 2003, is essentially the same as universal primer technology (UPT) and that both utilize standardized, short stretch of DNA from mitochondrial genome, amplified using the specific universal primers, to assign the identity of an unknown biological sample to a particular species. Verma claimed that UPT was described earlier than DNA barcoding in his patents, and publication; therefore, it should be fairly credited. However, Hebert argued that he was not aware of UPT because its patents were not visible to the broader scientific community due to a substantial interval from its filing in 2001 to grant in 2006.

== Literature ==
Wo desh ki beti' (The daughter of the Nation), poems written and narrated by Sunil Kumar Verma, depicting the national pain at the gang rape of its daughters

Verma has written several collections of Hindi poetry on social issues such as the 2012 Delhi gang rape. In 2014, his work was showcased in Hyderabad by the Association of British Scholars.

== Awards and honors ==
Some notable fellowships and awards conferred to Verma are as follows:

- IEmerging Forensic Scientist Continental Award (1999) from the International Association of Forensics Sciences
- Lindau Fellowship (2003) to represent Indian scholars at the Lindau Nobel Laureate Meetings in Physiology and Medicine in 2003
- Commonwealth Scholarship (2003)
- CSIR Technology Award for Life Sciences" (2008), Jointly conferred to Sunil Kumar Verma and Lalji Singh
- NRDC Societal Invention Award (2009), Jointly conferred to Sunil Kumar Verma and Lalji Singh
- The BioAsia Innovation Award (2009)
- Fellowship of Max Planck Institute for Infection Biology Berlin (2010–2013)
- Research ambassador of DAAD (2010-till death)

== Selected publications ==
- Verma, Sunil Kumar; Goswami, Gajendra (2014). "DNA evidence: Current perspective and future challenges in India". Forensic Science International. 241: 183–189. doi:10.1016/j.forsciint.2014.05.016. PMID 24967868.
- Verma, Sunil Kumar; Ganesan, Trivadi S.; Parker, Peter J. (2008). "The tumour suppressor RASSF1A is a novel substrate of PKC" (PDF). FEBS Letters. 582 (15): 2270–2276. doi:10.1016/j.febslet.2008.05.028. PMID 18514071. S2CID 26290925.
- Funk, Stephan M.; Verma, Sunil Kumar; Larson, Greger; Prasad, Kasturi; Singh, Lalji; Narayan, Gouam; Fa, John E. (2007). "The pygmy hog is a unique genus: 19th century taxonomists got it right first time round". Molecular Phylogenetics and Evolution. 45 (2): 427–436. doi:10.1016/j.ympev.2007.08.007. PMID 17905601.
- Verma, Sunil Kumar; Prasad, Kasturi; Nagesh, Narayan; Sultana, Mehar; Singh, Lalji (2003). "Was elusive carnivore a panther? DNA typing of faeces reveals the mystery". Forensic Science International. 137 (1): 16–20. doi:10.1016/S0379-0738(03)00277-9. PMID 14550608.
- Verma, Sunil Kumar; Singh, Lalji (2003). "Novel universal primers establish identity of enormous number of animal species for forensic application". Molecular Ecology Notes. 3: 28–31. doi:10.1046/j.1471-8286.2003.00340.x.
- Verma, Sunil Kumar; Khanna, Vijay; Singh, Nagendra (1999). "Random amplified polymorphic DNA analysis of Indian scented basmati rice (Oryza sativa L.) germplasm for identification of variability and duplicate accessions, if any". Electrophoresis. 20 (8): 1786–1789. doi:10.1002/(sici)1522-2683(19990101)20:8<1786::aid-elps1786>3.0.co;2-5. PMID 10435450. S2CID 21965899.
