= Artemisinin =

Group of drugs used against malaria

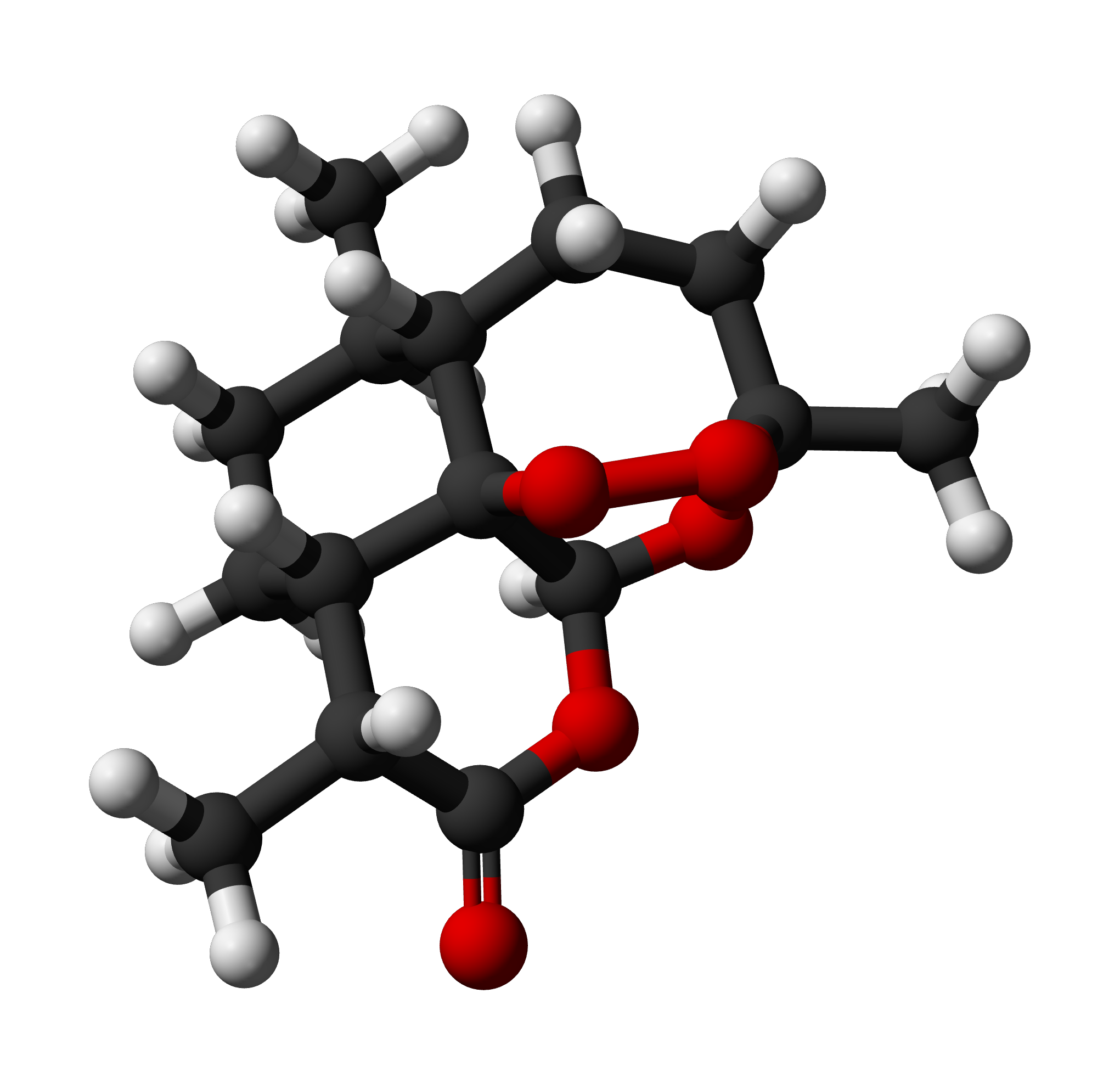

Clinical data
- Pronunciation: /ɑːrtɪˈmɪsɪnɪn/
- Other names: Artemisinine, qinghaosu
- Routes of administration: Oral
- ATC code: P01BE01 (WHO)

Identifiers
- IUPAC name: (3R,5aS,6R,8aS,9R,12S,12aR)-Octahydro-3,6,9-trimethyl-3,12-epoxy-12H-pyrano[4,3-j]-1,2-benzodioxepin-10(3H)-one
- CAS Number: 63968-64-9
- PubChem CID: 68827
- ChemSpider: 62060
- UNII: 9RMU91N5K2
- KEGG: D02481
- ChEBI: CHEBI:223316
- ChEMBL: ChEMBL567597
- CompTox Dashboard (EPA): DTXSID2040652
- ECHA InfoCard: 100.110.458

Chemical and physical data
- Formula: C_{15}H_{22}O_{5}
- Molar mass: 282.336 g·mol^{−1}
- 3D model (JSmol): Interactive image
- Density: 1.24 ± 0.1 g/cm^{3}
- Melting point: 152 to 157 °C (306 to 315 °F)
- Boiling point: decomposes
- SMILES: O=C3O[C@@H]4O[C@@]1(OO[C@@]42[C@@H](CC1)[C@H](C)CC[C@H]2[C@H]3C)C
- InChI: InChI=1S/C15H22O5/c1-8-4-5-11-9(2)12(16)17-13-15(11)10(8)6-7-14(3,18-13)19-20-15/h8-11,13H,4-7H2,1-3H3/t8-,9-,10+,11+,13-,14-,15-/m1/s1; Key:BLUAFEHZUWYNDE-NNWCWBAJSA-N

Artemisinin (/ˌɑːrtɪˈmiːsɪnɪn/) and its semisynthetic derivatives are a group of drugs used in the treatment of malaria due to Plasmodium falciparum. It was discovered in 1972 by Tu Youyou, who shared the 2015 Nobel Prize in Physiology or Medicine for her discovery. Artemisinin-based combination therapies (ACTs) have become standard treatment worldwide for P. falciparum malaria as well as malaria due to other species of Plasmodium. Artemisinin can be extracted from the herb Artemisia annua (sweet wormwood), which is used in traditional Chinese medicine. Alternatively, it can be prepared by a semi-synthetic method from a precursor compound that can be produced using a genetically engineered yeast, which is much more efficient than extraction from the plant.

Artemisinin and its derivatives are all sesquiterpene lactones containing an unusual peroxide bridge. This endoperoxide 1,2,4-trioxane ring is responsible for their antimalarial properties. Few other natural compounds with such a peroxide bridge are known.

Artemisinin and its derivatives have been used for the treatment of malarial and parasitic worm (helminth) infections. Advantages of such treatments over other anti-parasitics include faster parasite elimination and broader efficacy across the parasite life-cycle; disadvantages include their low bioavailability, poor pharmacokinetic properties, and high cost. Moreover, use of the drug by itself as a monotherapy is explicitly discouraged by the World Health Organization, as there have been signs that malarial parasites are developing resistance to the drug. Combination therapies, featuring artemisinin or its derivatives alongside some other antimalarial drug, constitute the contemporary standard-of-care treatment regimen for malaria.

== Medical use ==
The World Health Organization (WHO) recommends artemisinin or one of its derivatives ― typically in combination with a longer-lasting partner drug ― as frontline therapy for all cases of malaria. For uncomplicated malaria, the WHO recommends three days of oral treatment with any of five artemisinin-based combination therapies (ACTs): artemether/lumefantrine, artesunate/amodiaquine (ASAQ), artesunate/mefloquine, dihydroartemisinin/piperaquine, or artesunate/sulfadoxine/pyrimethamine. In each of these combinations, the artemisinin derivative rapidly kills the parasites, but is itself rapidly cleared from the body. The longer-lived partner drug kills the remaining parasites and provides some lingering protection from reinfection.

For severe malaria, the WHO recommends intravenous or intramuscular treatment with the artemisinin derivative artesunate for at least 24 hours. Artesunate treatment is continued until the treated person is well enough to take oral medication. They are then given a three-day course of an ACT, for uncomplicated malaria. Where artesunate is not available, the WHO recommends intramuscular injection of the less potent artemisinin derivative artemether. For children less than six years old, if injected artesunate is not available the WHO recommends rectal administration of artesunate, followed by referral to a facility with the resources for further care.

Artemisinins are not used for malaria prevention because of the extremely short activity (half-life) of the drug. To be effective, it would have to be administered multiple times each day.

=== Contraindications ===
The WHO recommends avoiding ACT for women in their first trimester of pregnancy due to a lack of research on artemisinin's safety in early pregnancy. Instead the WHO recommends a seven-day course of clindamycin and quinine. For pregnant women in their second or third trimesters, the WHO recommends a normal treatment course with an ACT. For some other groups, certain ACTs are avoided due to side effects of the partner drug: sulfadoxine-pyrimethamine is avoided during the first few weeks of life as it interferes with the action of bilirubin and can worsen neonatal jaundice. In HIV-positive people, the combination of trimethoprim/sulfamethoxazole, zidovudine-containing antiretroviral treatments, and ASAQ is associated with neutropenia. The combination of the HIV drug efavirenz and ASAQ is associated with liver toxicity.

== Adverse effects ==
Artemisinins are generally well tolerated at the doses used to treat malaria. The side effects from the artemisinin class of medications are similar to the symptoms of malaria: nausea, vomiting, loss of appetite, and dizziness. Mild blood abnormalities have also been noted. A rare but serious adverse effect is allergic reaction. One case of significant liver inflammation has been reported in association with prolonged use of a relatively high-dose of artemisinin for an unclear reason (the patient did not have malaria). The drugs used in combination therapies can contribute to the adverse effects experienced by those undergoing treatment. Adverse effects in patients with acute P. falciparum malaria treated with artemisinin derivatives tend to be higher.

== Chemistry ==
An unusual component of the artemisinin molecules is an endoperoxide 1,2,4-trioxane ring. This is the main antimalarial centre of the molecule. Modifications at carbon 10 (C10) position give rise to a variety of derivatives which are more powerful than the original compound. Because the physical properties of artemisinin itself, such as poor bioavailability, limit its effectiveness, semisynthetic derivatives of artemisinin have been developed. Derivatives of dihydroartemisinin were made since 1976. Artesunate, arteether, and artemether were first synthesized in 1986. Many derivatives have been produced of which artelinic acid, artemotil, artemisone, SM735, SM905, SM933, SM934, and SM1044 are among the most powerful compounds. There are also simplified analogs in preclinical development. Over 120 other derivatives have been prepared, but clinical testing has not been possible due to lack of financial support.

Artemisinin is poorly soluble in oils and water. Therefore, it is typically administered via the digestive tract, either by oral or rectal administration. Artesunate however can be administered via the intravenous and intramuscular, as well as the oral and rectal routes. A synthetic compound with a similar trioxolane structure (a ring containing three oxygen atoms) named RBx-11160 showed promise in in vitro testing. Phase II testing in patients with malaria was not as successful as hoped, but the manufacturer decided to start Phase III testing anyway.

== Mechanism of action ==
As of 2018, the exact mechanism of action of artemisinins has not been fully elucidated. Artemisinin itself is a prodrug of the biologically active dihydroartemisinin. This metabolite undergoes cleavage of its endoperoxide ring inside the erythrocytes. As the drug molecules come in contact with the haem (associated with the hemoglobin of the red blood cells), the iron(II) oxide breaks the endoperoxide ring. This process produces free radicals that in turn damage susceptible proteins, resulting in the death of the parasite. In 2016 artemisinin was shown to bind to a large number of targets suggesting that it acts in a promiscuous manner. Artemisinin's endoperoxide moiety is however less sensitive to free iron(II) oxide, and therefore more active in the intraerythrocytic stages of P. falciparum. In contrast, clinical practice shows that unlike other antimalarials, artemisinin is active during all life cycle stages of the parasite.

== Resistance ==
Clinical evidence for artemisinin drug resistance in southeast Asia was first reported in 2008, and was subsequently confirmed by a detailed study from western Cambodia. Resistance in neighbouring Thailand was reported in 2012, and in northern Cambodia, Vietnam and eastern Myanmar in 2014. Emerging resistance was reported in southern Laos, central Myanmar and northeastern Cambodia in 2014. The parasite's kelch gene on chromosome 13 appears to be a reliable molecular marker for clinical resistance in Southeast Asia.

In 2011, the WHO stated that resistance to the most effective antimalarial drug, artemisinin, could unravel national Indian malaria control programs, which have achieved significant progress in the last decade. WHO advocates the rational use of antimalarial drugs and acknowledges the crucial role of community health workers in reducing malaria in the region.

Artemisinins can be used alone, but this leads to a high rate of return of parasites and other drugs are required to clear the body of all parasites and prevent a recurrence. The WHO is pressuring manufacturers to stop making the uncompounded drug available to the medical community at large, aware of the catastrophe that would result if the malaria parasite developed resistance to artemisinins.

Two main mechanisms of resistance drive Plasmodium resistance to antimalarial drugs. The first one is an efflux of the drug away from its action site due to mutations in different transporter genes (like pfcrt in chloroquine resistance) or an increased number of the gene copies (like pfmdr1 copy number in mefloquine resistance). The second is a change in the parasite target due to mutations in corresponding genes (like, at the cytosol level, dhfr and dhps in sulfadoxine-pyrimethamine resistance or, at the mitochondrion level, cytochrome b in atovaquone resistance). Resistance of P. falciparum to the new artemisinin compounds involves a novel mechanism corresponding to a quiescence phenomenon.

== Synthesis ==
=== Biosynthesis in Artemisia annua ===
The biosynthesis of artemisinin in the plant Artemisia annua is believed to involve the mevalonate pathway (MVA) and the cyclization of farnesyl diphosphate (FDP). It is not clear whether the non-mevalonate pathway can also contribute 5-carbon precursors (IPP or DMAPP), as occurs in other sesquiterpene biosynthetic systems. The routes from artemisinic alcohol to artemisinin remain controversial, and they differ mainly in when the reduction step takes place. Both routes suggested dihydroartemisinic acid as the final precursor to artemisinin. Dihydroartemisinic acid then undergoes photo-oxidation to produce dihydroartemisinic acid hydroperoxide. Ring expansion by the cleavage of hydroperoxide and a second oxygen-mediated hydroperoxidation finish the biosynthesis of artemisinin.

Figure 1. Biosynthesis of Artemisinin

=== Chemical synthesis ===
The total synthesis of artemisinin has been performed from available organic starting materials, using basic organic reagents, many times. The first two total syntheses were a stereoselective synthesis by Schmid and Hofheinz at Hoffmann-La Roche in Basel starting from (−)-isopulegol (13 steps, ~5% overall yield), and a concurrent synthesis by Zhou and coworkers at the Shanghai Institute of Organic Chemistry from (R)-(+)-citronellal (20 steps, ~0.3% overall yield). Key steps of the Schmid–Hofheinz approach included an initial Ohrloff stereoselective hydroboration/oxidation to establish the "off-ring" methyl stereocenter on the propene side chain; two sequential lithium-reagent mediated alkylations that introduced all needed carbon atoms and that were, together highly diastereoselective; and further reduction, oxidation, and desilylation steps performed on this mono-carbocyclic intermediate, including a final singlet oxygen-utilizing photooxygenation and ene reaction, which, after acidic workup closed the three remaining oxacyclic rings of the desired product, artemisinin, in a single step. (In essence, the final oxidative ring-closing operation in these syntheses accomplishes the closing three biosynthetic steps shown above.)

A wide variety of further routes continue to be explored, from early days until today, including total synthesis routes from (R)-(+)-pulegone, isomenthene, and even 2-cyclohexen-1-one, as well as routes better described as partial or semisyntheses from a more plentiful biosynthetic precursor, artemisinic acid—in the latter case, including some very short and very high yielding biomimetic synthesis examples (of Roth and Acton, and Haynes et al., 3 steps, 30% yield), which again feature the singlet oxygen ene chemistry.

=== Synthesis in engineered organisms ===
The partnership to develop semisynthetic artemisinin was led by PATH's Drug Development program (through an affiliation with OneWorld Health), with funding from the Bill & Melinda Gates Foundation. The project began in 2004, and initial project partners included the University of California, Berkeley (which provided the technology on which the project was based – a process that genetically altered yeast to produce artemisinic acid) and Amyris (a biotechnology firm in California, which refined the process to enable large-scale production and developed scalable processes for transfer to an industrial partner).

In 2006, a team from UC Berkeley reported they had engineered Saccharomyces cerevisiae yeast to produce a small amount of the precursor artemisinic acid. The synthesized artemisinic acid can then be transported out, purified and chemically converted into artemisinin that they claim will cost roughly US$0.25 per dose. In this effort of synthetic biology, a modified mevalonate pathway was used, and the yeast cells were engineered to express the enzyme amorphadiene synthase and a cytochrome P450 monooxygenase (CYP71AV1), both from Artemisia annua. A three-step oxidation of amorpha-4,11-diene gives the resulting artemisinic acid.

The UC Berkeley method was augmented using technology from various other organizations. The final successful technology is based on inventions licensed from UC Berkeley and the National Research Council (NRC) Plant Biotechnology Institute of Canada.

Commercial production of semisynthetic artemisinin is now underway at Sanofi's site in Garessio, Italy. This second source of artemisinin is poised to enable a more stable flow of key antimalarial treatments to those who need them most. The production goal is set at 35 tonnes for 2013. It is expected to increase to 50–60 tons per year in 2014, supplying approximately one-third of the global annual need for artemisinin.

In 2013, WHO's Prequalification of Medicines Programme announced the acceptability of semisynthetic artemisinin for use in the manufacture of active pharmaceutical ingredients submitted to WHO for prequalification, or that have already been qualified by WHO. Sanofi's active pharmaceutical ingredient (API) produced from semisynthetic artemisinin (artesunate) was also prequalified by WHO on May 8, 2013, making it the first semisynthetic artemisinin derivative prequalified.

In 2010, a team from Wageningen University and Research reported they had engineered a close relative of tobacco, Nicotiana benthamiana, that can also produce the precursor, artemisinic acid.

== Production and price ==
China and Vietnam provide 70% and East Africa 20% of the raw plant material. Seedlings are grown in nurseries and then transplanted into fields. It takes about 8 months for them to reach full size. The plants are harvested, the leaves are dried and sent to facilities where the artemisinin is extracted using a solvent, typically hexane. Alternative extraction methods have been proposed. The market price for artemisinin has fluctuated widely, between US$120 and $1,200 per kilogram from 2005 to 2008.

The Chinese company Artepharm created a combination artemisinin and piperaquine drug marketed as Artequick. In addition to clinical research performed in China and southeast Asia, Artequick was used in large-scale malaria eradication efforts in the Comoros. Those efforts, conducted in 2007, 2012, and 2013–14, produced a 95–97% reduction in the number of malaria cases in the Comoros.

After negotiation with the WHO, Novartis and Sanofi provide ACT drugs at cost on a nonprofit basis; however, these drugs are still more expensive than other malaria treatments. Artesunate injection for severe malaria treatment is made by the Guilin Pharmaceutical factory in China where production has received WHO prequalification. High-yield varieties of Artemisia are being produced by the Centre for Novel Agricultural Products at the University of York using molecular breeding techniques.

Using seed supplied by Action for Natural Medicine (ANAMED), the World Agroforestry Centre (ICRAF) has developed a hybrid, dubbed A3, which can grow to a height of 3 meters and produce 20 times more artemisinin than wild varieties. In northwestern Mozambique, ICRAF is working together with a medical organization, Médecins Sans Frontières, ANAMED and the Ministry of Agriculture and Rural Development to train farmers on how to grow the shrub from cuttings, and to harvest and dry the leaves to make artemisia tea. However, the WHO does not recommend the use of A. annua plant materials, including tea, for the prevention and treatment of malaria.

In 2013, Sanofi announced the launch of a production facility in Garessio, Italy, to manufacture the antiplasmodial drug on a large scale. The partnership to create a new pharmaceutical manufacturing process was led by PATH's Drug Development program (through an affiliation with OneWorld Health), with funding from the Bill & Melinda Gates Foundation and based on a modified biosynthetic process for artemisinic acid, initially designed by Jay Keasling at UC Berkeley and optimized by Amyris. The reaction is followed by a photochemical process creating singlet oxygen to obtain the end product. Sanofi expects to produce 25 tons of artemisinin in 2013, ramping up the production to 55–60 tonnes in 2014. The price per kilogram will be US$350–400, roughly the same as the botanical source. Despite concerns that this equivalent source would lead to the demise of companies, which produce this substance conventionally through extraction of A. annua biomass, an increased supply of this drug will likely produce lower prices and therefore increase the availability for ACT treatment. In 2014, Sanofi announced the release of the first batch of semisynthetic artemisinin. 1.7 million doses of Sanofi's ASAQ, a fixed-dose artemisinin-based combination therapy will be shipped to half a dozen African countries over the next few months.

A 2016 systematic review of four studies from East Africa concluded that subsidizing ACT in the private retail sector in combination with training and marketing has led to the increased availability of ACT in stores, increased use of ACT for febrile children under five years of age, and decrease in the use of older, less effective antimalarials among children under five years of age. The underlying studies did not determine if the children had malaria nor determine if there were health benefits.

== Metabolism ==
After ingestion or injection, artemisinin and its derivatives (arteether, artemether, and artesunate) are all rapidly converted in the bloodstream to dihydroartemisinin (DHA), which has 5–10 times greater antimalarial potency than artemisinin. DHA is eventually converted in the liver into metabolites such as deoxyartemisinin, deoxydihydroartemisinin, and 9,10-dihydrodeoxyartemisinin. These reactions are catalyzed by the enzymes CYP2A6, CYP3A4, and CYP3A5, which belong to the cytochrome P450 group present in the smooth endoplasmic reticulum. These metabolites lack antimalarial properties due to the loss of the endoperoxide group (deoxyartemisinin however has anti-inflammatory and antiulcer properties.) All these metabolites undergo glucuronidation, after which they are excreted through the urine or feces. Glucuronosyltransferases, in particular UGT1A9 and UGT2B7, are responsible for this process. DHA is also removed through bile as minor glucuronides. Due to their rapid metabolism, artemisinin and its derivatives are relatively safe drugs with a relatively high therapeutic index.

== History ==
=== Etymology ===
Artemisinin is an antimalarial lactone derived from Artemisia annua or sweet wormwood. In 1596, Li Shizhen recommended tea made from 'sweet wormwood specifically to treat malaria symptoms in his Compendium of Materia Medica. The genus name is derived from the Greek goddess Artemis and, more specifically, may have been named after Queen Artemisia II of Caria, a botanist and medical researcher in the fourth century BC.

=== Discovery ===
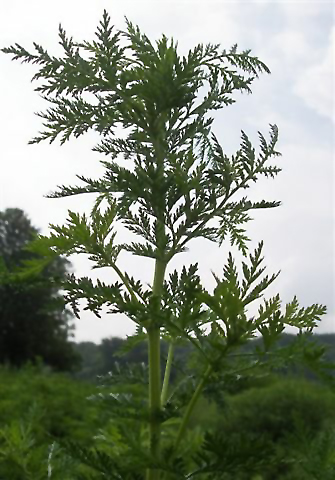
Artemisia annua

Artemisia annua is a common herb found in many parts of the world. In 1967, a plant screening research program, under a secret military program code-named "Project 523", was set up by the People's Liberation Army to find an adequate treatment for malaria; the program and early clinical work were ordered by Mao Zedong at the request of North Vietnamese leaders to provide assistance for their malaria-ridden army. In the course of this research in 1972, Tu Youyou discovered artemisinin in the leaves of Artemisia annua.

Named qinghaosu (Chinese: 青蒿素; lit. 'compound of green-blue wormwood'), it was one of many candidates tested as possible treatments for malaria by Chinese scientists, from a list of nearly 2,000 traditional Chinese medicines. Tu Youyou also discovered that a low-temperature extraction process could be used to isolate an effective antimalarial substance from the plant. Tu says she was influenced by a traditional Chinese herbal medicine source The Handbook of Prescriptions for Emergency Treatments written in 340 CE by Ge Hong saying that this herb should be steeped in cold water. This book contained the useful reference to the herb: "A handful of qinghao immersed with two litres of water, wring out the juice and drink it all."

Tu's team subsequently isolated an extract. Results were published in the Chinese Medical Journal in 1979. The extracted substance, once subject to purification, proved to be a useful starting point to obtain purified artemisinin. A 2012 review reported that artemisinin-based therapies were the most effective drugs for treatment of malaria at that time; it was also reported to clear malaria parasites from patients' bodies faster than other drugs. In addition to artemisinin, Project 523 developed a number of products that can be used in combination with artemisinin, including lumefantrine, piperaquine, and pyronaridine.

In the late 1990s, Novartis filed a new Chinese patent for a combination treatment with artemether/lumefantrine, providing the first artemisinin-based combination therapies (Coartem) at reduced prices to the WHO. In 2006, after artemisinin had become the treatment of choice for malaria, the WHO called for an immediate halt to single-drug artemisinin preparations in favor of combinations of artemisinin with another malaria drug, to reduce the risk of parasites developing resistance.

In 2011, Tu Youyou was awarded the Lasker-DeBakey Clinical Medical Research Award for her role in the discovery and development of artemisinin. On October 5, 2015, she was awarded half of the 2015 Nobel Prize in Physiology or Medicine for discovering artemisinin, "a drug that has significantly reduced the mortality rates for patients suffering from malaria". The other half of the prize was awarded jointly to William C. Campbell and Satoshi Ōmura for discovering avermectin, "the derivatives of which have radically lowered the incidence of river blindness and lymphatic filariasis, as well as showing efficacy against an expanding number of other parasitic diseases".

== Research ==
=== New artemisinin-based combination therapies ===
The WHO notes four additional ACTs that are in preliminary clinical trials or regionally used for which there is no evidence to recommend widespread use: artesunate/pyronaridine, arterolane-piperaquine, artemisinin-piperaquine base, and artemisinin/naphthoquine.

=== Helminthiasis ===
A serendipitous discovery was made in China in the early 1980s while searching for novel anthelmintics for schistosomiasis that artemisinin was effective against schistosomes, the human blood flukes, which are the second-most prevalent parasitic infections, after malaria. Artemisinin and its derivatives are all potent antihelmintics. Artemisinins were later found to possess a broad spectrum of activity against a wide range of trematodes, including Schistosoma japonicum, S. mansoni, S. haematobium, Clonorchis sinensis, Fasciola hepatica, and Opisthorchis viverrini.

=== Cancer ===
Artemisinin and its derivatives are under laboratory research for their potential anti-cancer effects. As of 2018, only preliminary clinical research had been conducted using artemisininin derivatives in various cancers, with no approved clinical applications.

=== Autoimmune disease ===
Artemisinin derivatives may suppress immune reactions, such as inflammation. One derivative, SM934, was approved in 2015 by the Chinese National Medical Products Administration for a clinical trial as a drug for systemic lupus erythematosus.

=== Polycystic ovary syndrome ===
Artemisinin may be potentially useful for treating symptoms of polycystic ovary syndrome (PCOS).

== See also ==
- Artemisia (genus)
- Artemisin
- Santonin
- Pharmacognosy
