= Artesunate/mefloquine =

Antimalarial drug

Combination of
- Artesunate: Artemisinin
- Mefloquine: Antimalarial

Clinical data
- ATC code: P01BF02 (WHO)

Identifiers
- CAS Number: 60473-87-2
- CompTox Dashboard (EPA): DTXSID50198067

Artesunate/mefloquine is a medication used to treat malaria. It is a fixed dose combination of artesunate and mefloquine. Specifically it is recommended to treat uncomplicated falciparum malaria. It is taken by mouth.

Side effects are similar to the medications being used separately. Use is recommended as it decreases the possibility of either medications being used alone. Dose forms appropriate for children are also available.

Artesunate/mefloquine came into commercial use in 2008. It is on the World Health Organization's List of Essential Medicines. It is approved for medical use in Brazil, India, and Malaysia. It is not commercially available in the United States.

== Medical uses ==
Artesunate/mefloquine is a recommended treatment in Southeast Asia while in Africa artesunate/amodiaquine, artemether/lumefantrine, artesunate/sulfadoxine/pyrimethamine are often preferred.

== See also ==
- Dihydroartemisinin/piperaquine
