= Amorpha-4,11-diene 12-monooxygenase =

Class of enzymes

Identifiers
- EC no.: 1.14.14.114

Databases
- IntEnz: IntEnz view
- BRENDA: BRENDA entry
- ExPASy: NiceZyme view
- KEGG: KEGG entry
- MetaCyc: metabolic pathway
- PRIAM: profile
- PDB structures: RCSB PDB PDBe PDBsum
Search
- PMC: articles
- PubMed: articles
- NCBI: proteins

Amorpha-4,11-diene 12-monooxygenase (EC 1.14.14.114, CYP71AV1) is an enzyme with systematic name amorpha-4,11-diene,NADPH:oxygen oxidoreductase (12-hydroxylating). This enzyme catalyses the following overall chemical reaction

amorpha-4,11-diene
3 O_{2}
4 H_{2}O
artemisinic acid

Artemisinin

The reaction proceeds in three oxidations, each catalysed by the enzyme, which is a cytochrome P450 protein containing heme, isolated from Artemisia annua. It requires a partner cytochrome P450 reductase for functional expression. This uses nicotinamide adenine dinucleotide phosphate. The product is used by the plant in the biosynthesis of artemisinin.
