= ATC code P01 =

ATC code P01 Antiprotozoals is a therapeutic subgroup of the Anatomical Therapeutic Chemical Classification System, a system of alphanumeric codes developed by the World Health Organization (WHO) for the classification of drugs and other medical products. Subgroup P01 is part of the anatomical group P Antiparasitic products, insecticides and repellents.

National versions of the ATC classification may include additional codes not present in this list, which follows the WHO version.

== P01A Agents against amoebiasis and other protozoal diseases ==
=== P01AA Hydroxyquinoline derivatives ===
P01AA01 Broxyquinoline
P01AA02 Clioquinol
P01AA04 Chlorquinaldol
P01AA05 Tilbroquinol
P01AA30 Tilbroquinol and tiliquinol
P01AA52 Clioquinol, combinations

=== P01AB Nitroimidazole derivatives ===
P01AB01 Metronidazole
P01AB02 Tinidazole
P01AB03 Ornidazole
P01AB04 Azanidazole
P01AB05 Propenidazole
P01AB06 Nimorazole
P01AB07 Secnidazole
P01AB08 Satranidazole
P01AB51 Metronidazole and furazolidone
P01AB52 Metronidazole and diloxanide
P01AB53 Tinidazole and diloxanide

=== P01AC Dichloroacetamide derivatives ===
P01AC01 Diloxanide
P01AC02 Clefamide
P01AC03 Etofamide
P01AC04 Teclozan

=== P01AR Arsenic compounds ===
P01AR01 Arsthinol
P01AR02 Difetarsone
P01AR03 Glycobiarsol
P01AR53 Glycobiarsol, combinations

=== P01AX Other agents against amoebiasis and other protozoal diseases ===
P01AX01 Chiniofon
P01AX02 Emetine
P01AX04 Phanquinone
P01AX05 Mepacrine
P01AX06 Atovaquone
P01AX07 Trimetrexate
P01AX08 Tenonitrozole
P01AX09 Dehydroemetine
P01AX10 Fumagillin
P01AX11 Nitazoxanide
P01AX52 Emetine, combinations

== P01B Antimalarials ==
=== P01BA Aminoquinolines ===
P01BA01 Chloroquine
P01BA02 Hydroxychloroquine
P01BA03 Primaquine
P01BA06 Amodiaquine
P01BA07 Tafenoquine

=== P01BB Biguanides ===
P01BB01 Proguanil
P01BB02 Cycloguanil embonate
P01BB51 Proguanil and atovaquone
P01BB52 Chloroquine and proguanil

=== P01BC Methanolquinolines ===
P01BC01 Quinine
P01BC02 Mefloquine

=== P01BD Diaminopyrimidines ===
P01BD01 Pyrimethamine
P01BD51 Pyrimethamine, combinations

=== P01BE Artemisinin and derivatives, plain ===
P01BE01 Artemisinin
P01BE02 Artemether
P01BE03 Artesunate
P01BE04 Artemotil
P01BE05 Artenimol

=== P01BF Artemisinin and derivatives, combinations ===
P01BF01 Artemether and lumefantrine
P01BF02 Artesunate and mefloquine
P01BF03 Artesunate and amodiaquine
P01BF04 Artesunate, sulfalene and pyrimethamine
P01BF05 Artenimol and piperaquine
P01BF06 Artesunate and pyronaridine
P01BF07 Artemisinin and piperaquine
P01BF08 Artemisinin and naphthoquine
P01BF09 Artesunate, sulfadoxine and pyrimethamine

=== P01BX Other antimalarials ===
P01BX01 Halofantrine
P01BX02 Arterolane and piperaquine

== P01C Agents against leishmaniasis and trypanosomiasis ==
=== P01CA Nitroimidazole derivatives ===
P01CA02 Benznidazole
P01CA03 Fexinidazole

=== P01CB Antimony compounds ===
P01CB01 Meglumine antimonate
P01CB02 Sodium stibogluconate

=== P01CC Nitrofuran derivatives ===
P01CC01 Nifurtimox
P01CC02 Nitrofural

=== P01CD Arsenic compounds ===
P01CD01 Melarsoprol
P01CD02 Acetarsol

=== P01CX Other agents against leishmaniasis and trypanosomiasis ===
P01CX01 Pentamidine isethionate
P01CX02 Suramin sodium
P01CX03 Eflornithine
P01CX04 Miltefosine
