= David A. Fidock =

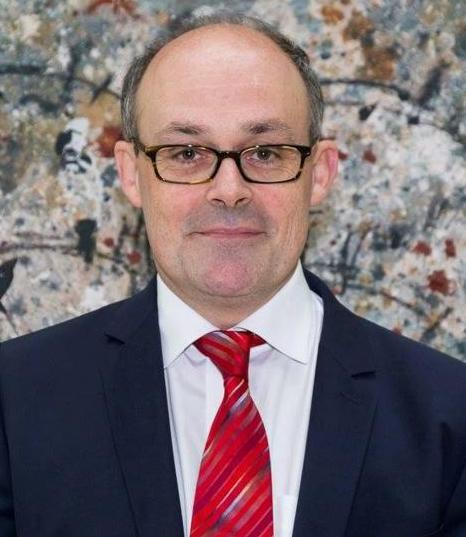
- Education: University of Adelaide; University Paris VII; University of California, Irvine
- Scientific career
- Fields: Microbiology, immunology
- Workplaces: Biotechnology Australia; Pasteur Institute; University of California, Irvine; National Institutes of Allergy and Infectious Diseases, NIH; Albert Einstein College of Medicine; Columbia University Irving Medical Center
- Thesis: Molecular and Immuno-Epidemiological Studies of the Plasmodium falciparum STARP and LSA-1 Antigens Expressed During the Pre-Erythrocytic Stages in Humans (1994)
- Doctoral advisor: Pierre Druilhe
- Website: www.fidock.org

David A. Fidock (born 8 December 1965 in Paris, France), is the CS Hamish Young Professor of Microbiology and Immunology and Professor of Medical Sciences at Columbia University Irving Medical Center in Manhattan.

== Education ==
Fidock attended the University of Adelaide and earned a bachelor of mathematical sciences and an honors degree in genetics in 1985. He earned a PhD in microbiology from the Institut Pasteur in Paris in 1994. His dissertation advisor was Pierre Druilhe, and his thesis was titled "Molecular and Immuno-Epidemiological Studies of the Plasmodium falciparum STARP and LSA-1 Antigens Expressed During the Pre-Erythrocytic Stages in Humans". He underwent postdoctoral training with Anthony James at University of California, Irvine, and with Thomas Wellems at the National Institutes of Health.

== Career ==
After his post-doctoral training, Fidock joined the Albert Einstein College of Medicine in New York as an assistant professor in the Department of Microbiology and Immunology. In 2007, Fidock became an associate professor at Columbia University in the Departments of Microbiology and Immunology and of Medicine (Division of Infectious Diseases). Since 2008, Fidock has been a tenured professor of microbiology and immunology and of medical sciences at Columbia. In 2017 he received the C.S. Hamish Young endowed professorship. From 2008 to 2023 he served as the program director of the NIH T32-funded graduate program in microbiology, immunology, and infection. From 2024-2025, he served as the elected president of the American Society of Tropical Medicine and Hygiene. In 2025-26 he undertook a sabbatical at the Institut Pasteur in Paris, serving as Scientific Advisor to the President, Yasmine Belkaid.

== Research ==
Fidock's research focuses on the genetic and molecular mechanisms behind antimalarial drug resistance in the human parasite Plasmodium falciparum, as well as target-based drug discovery and development, and parasite metabolism and biology. He led the development of methods for genetically modifying malaria parasites and for elucidating the genetic basis of P. falciparum resistance to various first-line medicines (including artemisinin, chloroquine and piperaquine).

He has published more than 330 papers on malaria, with a current h-index of 108. His work has been cited over 44,000 times. His work has been funded by the NIH, the Bill & Melinda Gates Foundation, the Department of Defense, the Burroughs Wellcome Fund and the Medicines for Malaria Venture.

== Honors ==
- 1992 "Bourse Roux" Scholarship, Pasteur Institute, Paris
- 1994 Ph.D. Graduate, Summa cum Laude, University Paris VII/Pasteur Institute, Paris
- 2001 New Initiatives in Malaria Research, Burroughs Wellcome Fund
- 2001 Speaker's Fund in Biomedical Research, New York Academy of Medicine
- 2001 New Scholar in Global Infectious Disease, Ellison Medical Foundation
- 2004 Investigator in Pathogenesis of Infectious Disease, Burroughs Wellcome Fund
- 2014 Recipient of the Bailey K. Ashford Medal for Distinguished Research in Tropical Medicine from the American Society of Tropical Medicine and Hygiene
- 2015 Elected to the Council of the American Society of Tropical Medicine and Hygiene
- 2016 Elected as a Fellow of the American Society of Tropical Medicine and Hygiene
- 2016 Advance Global Australian of the Year in Life Sciences, given by the Australian Prime Minister
- 2020 Recipient, William Trager Medal for transformative research in molecular parasitology, American Society of Tropical Medicine and Hygiene
- 2020 Winner of the 2020 Project of the Year from the Medicines for Malaria Venture for critical contribution to malaria drug resistance profiling
- 2023 Elected Member, American Academy of Microbiology
- 2024 President of the American Society of Tropical Medicine and Hygiene
- 2025 Winner of the Alice and CC Wang Award in Molecular Parasitology, American Society of Biochemistry and Molecular Biology

== Recent Selected Publications ==
- Identification of genetic markers of quinine partial resistance in Plasmodium falciparum. Nature Microbiology (2026). 11: 2213-31.
- Towards next-generation treatment options to combat Plasmodium falciparum malaria. Nature Rev Microbiol (2024). 23: 178-91.
- The emergence of artemisinin partial resistance in Africa: how do we respond? Lancet Infect Dis (2024). 24: e591-600.
- tRNA modification reprogramming contributes to artemisinin resistance in Plasmodium falciparum. Nature Microbiology (2024). 9: 1483-98.
- Antimalarial drug discovery: progress and approaches. Nature Rev Drug Discov (2023). 22: 807-26.
- Mapping the genomic landscape of multidrug resistance in Plasmodium falciparum and its impact on parasite fitness. Science Adv (2023). 9: eadi2364.
- Mitigating the risk of antimalarial resistance via covalent dual-subunit inhibition of the Plasmodium proteasome. Cell Chem Biol (2023). 30: 470-85.e6.
- Evidence of artemisinin-resistant malaria in Africa. N Engl J Med (2022). 386: 1385-6.
- The antimalarial MMV688533 provides potential for single-dose cures with a high barrier to Plasmodium falciparum parasite resistance. Sci Transl Med (2021). 13: eabg6013.
- Plasmodium falciparum K13 mutations in Africa and Asia impact artemisinin resistance and parasite fitness. Elife (2021). 10: e66277.
- Inhibition of resistance-refractory P. falciparum kinase PKG delivers prophylactic, blood stage, and transmission-blocking antiplasmodial activity. Cell Chem Biol (2020). 27: 806-16.
- Plasmodium falciparum resistance to piperaquine driven by PfCRT. Lancet Infect Dis (2020). 19: 1168-9.
- Structure and drug resistance of the Plasmodium falciparum transporter PfCRT. Nature (2019). 576: 315-20.

== Notable Selected Publications ==
- Systematic in vitro evolution in Plasmodium falciparum reveals key determinants of drug resistance. Science (2024). 386: eadk9893.
- Increasing prevalence of artemisinin-resistant HRP2-negative malaria in Eritrea. N Engl J Med (2023). 389: 1191-202.
- Cytoplasmic isoleucyl tRNA synthetase as an attractive multistage antimalarial drug target. Sci Transl Med (2023). 15: eadc9249.
- Emergence and clonal expansion of in vitro artemisinin-resistant Plasmodium falciparum kelch13 R561H mutant parasites in Rwanda. Nature Med (2020). 26: 1602-8.
- Molecular mechanisms of drug resistance in Plasmodium falciparum malaria. Annu Rev Microbiol (2020). 74: 431-54.
- Open-source discovery of chemical leads for next-generation chemoprotective antimalarials. Science (2018). 362: eaat9446.
- Mapping the malaria parasite druggable genome by using in vitro evolution and chemogenomics. Science (2018). 359: 191-9.
- Antimalarial efficacy of MMV390048, an inhibitor of Plasmodium phosphatidylinositol 4-kinase. Sci Transl Med (2017). 9: eaad9735.
- A worldwide map of Plasmodium falciparum K13-propeller polymorphisms. N Engl J Med (2016). 374: 2453-64.
- A novel multiple-stage antimalarial agent that inhibits protein synthesis. Nature (2015). 522: 315-20.
- Profiling the essential nature of lipid metabolism in asexual blood and gametocyte stages of Plasmodium falciparum. Cell Host Microbe (2015). 18: 371-81.
- K13-propeller mutations confer artemisinin resistance in Plasmodium falciparum clinical isolates. Science (2015). 347: 428-31.
- Targeting Plasmodium PI(4)K to eliminate malaria. Nature (2013). 504: 248-53.
- Eliminating malaria. Science (2013). 340: 1531-3.
- Site-specific genome editing in Plasmodium falciparum using engineered zinc-finger nucleases. Nature Methods (2012). 9: 993-8.
- Imaging of Plasmodium liver stages to drive next-generation antimalarial drug discovery. Science (2011). 334: 1372-7.
- Quantitative assessment of Plasmodium falciparum sexual development reveals potent transmission-blocking activity by methylene blue. Proc Natl Acad Sci USA (2011). 108: E1214-23.
- Spiroindolones, a potent compound class for the treatment of malaria. Science (2010). 329: 1175-80.
- The fatty acid biosynthesis enzyme FabI plays a key role in the development of liver-stage malarial parasites. Cell Host Microbe (2008). 4: 567-78.
- Efficient site-specific integration in Plasmodium falciparum chromosomes mediated by mycobacteriophage Bxb1 integrase. Nature Methods (2006). 3: 615-21.
- Evidence for a central role for PfCRT in conferring Plasmodium falciparum resistance to diverse antimalarial agents. Mol Cell (2004). 15: 867-77.
- Antimalarial drug discovery: efficacy models for compound screening. Nature Rev Drug Discov (2004). 3: 509-20.
- Chloroquine resistance in Plasmodium falciparum malaria parasites conferred by pfcrt mutations. Science (2002). 298: 210-3.
- A molecular marker for chloroquine-resistant falciparum malaria. N Engl J Med (2001). 344: 257-63.
- Mutations in the P. falciparum digestive vacuole transmembrane protein PfCRT and evidence for their role in chloroquine resistance. Mol Cell (2000). 6: 861-71.
