= Artelinic acid =

Chemical compound

Clinical data
- ATC code: none

Identifiers
- IUPAC name: 4-[(3R,5aS,6R,8aS,9R,10S,12R,12aR)-decahydro- 3,6,9-trimethyl-3,12-epoxy-12H-pyrano[4,3-j]-1,2- benzodioxepin-10-yl]oxy]methylbenzoic acid
- CAS Number: 120020-26-0
- PubChem CID: 180423; beta-Artelinic acid: 10341948
- ChemSpider: 8517407
- UNII: 08X93406PG
- ChEMBL: ChEMBL477080
- CompTox Dashboard (EPA): DTXSID501316558

Chemical and physical data
- Formula: C_{23}H_{30}O_{7}
- Molar mass: 418.486 g·mol^{−1}
- 3D model (JSmol): Interactive image
- SMILES: O=C(O)c1ccc(cc1)CO[C@H]4O[C@@H]5O[C@@]3(OO[C@]52[C@@H](CC[C@@H](C)[C@@H]2CC3)[C@H]4C)C
- InChI: InChI=1S/C23H30O7/c1-13-4-9-18-14(2)20(26-12-15-5-7-16(8-6-15)19(24)25)27-21-23(18)17(13)10-11-22(3,28-21)29-30-23/h5-8,13-14,17-18,20-21H,4,9-12H2,1-3H3,(H,24,25)/t13-,14-,17+,18+,20+,21-,22-,23-/m1/s1; Key:UVNHKOOJXSALHN-ILQPJIFQSA-N

Artelinic acid (or its salt, artelinate) is an experimental drug that is being investigated as a treatment for malaria. It is a semi-synthetic derivative of the natural compound artemisinin. Artelinic acid has a lower rate of neurotoxicity than the related artemisinin derivatives arteether and artemether, but is three times more toxic than artesunate. At present, artelinic acid seems unlikely to enter routine clinical use, because it offers no clear benefits over the artemesinins already available (artesunate and artemether). Artelinic acid has not yet been evaluated for use in humans.
