= Teclozan =

Chemical compound

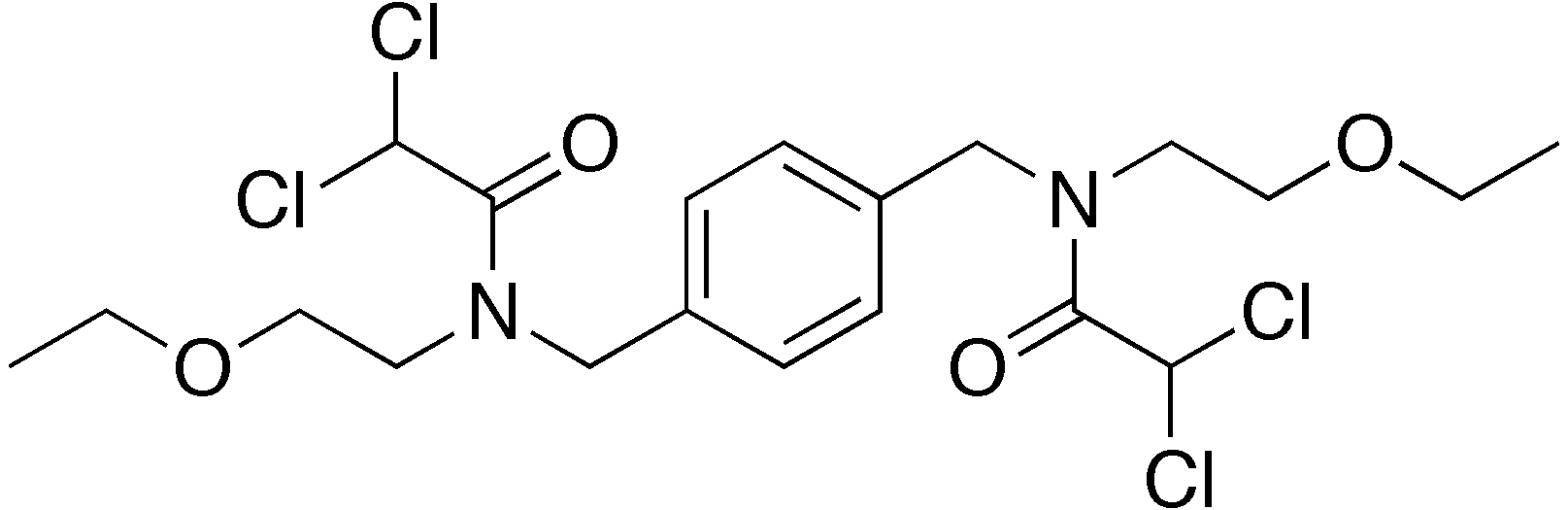

Clinical data
- AHFS/Drugs.com: International Drug Names
- ATC code: P01AC04 (WHO)

Identifiers
- IUPAC name: 2,2-Dichloro-N-[[4-[[(2,2-dichloroacetyl)-(2-ethoxyethyl)amino]methyl]phenyl]methyl]-N-(2-ethoxyethyl)acetamide
- CAS Number: 5560-78-1
- PubChem CID: 21723
- ChemSpider: 20418
- UNII: K9RIF0COUB
- KEGG: D06051
- CompTox Dashboard (EPA): DTXSID00204147
- ECHA InfoCard: 100.024.486

Chemical and physical data
- Formula: C_{20}H_{28}Cl_{4}N_{2}O_{4}
- Molar mass: 502.25 g·mol^{−1}
- 3D model (JSmol): Interactive image
- SMILES: CCOCCN(CC1=CC=C(C=C1)CN(CCOCC)C(=O)C(Cl)Cl)C(=O)C(Cl)Cl
- InChI: InChI=1S/C20H28Cl4N2O4/c1-3-29-11-9-25(19(27)17(21)22)13-15-5-7-16(8-6-15)14-26(10-12-30-4-2)20(28)18(23)24/h5-8,17-18H,3-4,9-14H2,1-2H3; Key:MSJLJWCAEPENBL-UHFFFAOYSA-N

Teclozan is an antiprotozoal agent. It is a dichloroacetamide.
