= Fidock =

Fidock is a surname. Notable people with the surname include:

- Harold Fidock (1902–1986), Australian cricketer
- David A. Fidock (born 1965), Australian microbiologist and immunologist
