= Piperaquine/dihydroartemisinin =

Malaria treatment drug

Combination of
- Piperaquine: Antimalarial
- Dihydroartemisinin: Antimalarial

Clinical data
- Trade names: DuoCotecxin, Artekin, Eurartesim, others
- Other names: Dihydroartemisinin/piperaquine phosphate
- Routes of administration: By mouth

Legal status
- Legal status: UK: In general: ℞ (Prescription only)

Identifiers
- CAS Number: 497968-03-3

Piperaquine/dihydroartemisinin (DHA/PPQ), sold under the brand name Eurartesim among others, is a fixed dose combination medication used in the treatment of malaria. It is a combination of piperaquine and dihydroartemisinin. Specifically it is used for malaria of the P. falciparum and P. vivax types. It is taken by mouth.

Side effects are uncommon. Concerns include the possibility of QT prolongation. Versions are available for use in children. Use in early pregnancy is not recommended. The two medications work by different mechanisms.

Piperaquine/dihydroartemisinin was approved for medical use in Europe in 2011. The combination is on the World Health Organization's List of Essential Medicines. It is commercially available in Africa and Asia. It has been used to treat more than 4.5 million people as of 2017.

== Pharmacology ==
Dihydroartemisinin (also known as dihydroqinghaosu, artenimol or DHA) is a drug used to treat malaria. Dihydroartemisinin is the active metabolite of all artemisinin compounds (artemisinin, artesunate, artemether, etc.) and is also available as a drug in itself. It is a semi-synthetic derivative of artemisinin and is widely used as an intermediate in the preparation of other artemisinin-derived antimalarial drugs.

Piperaquine is an antimalarial drug, a bisquinoline first made in the 1960s, and used extensively in China and Indochina as prophylaxis and treatment during the next 20 years. Usage declined in the 1980s as piperaquine-resistant strains of P. falciparum arose and artemisinin-based antimalarials became available. The combination dihydroartemisinin-piperaquine is an effective antimalarial that is used widely around the world. In South-East Asia, where resistance has emerged towards both artemisinin and piperaquine, the combination is being trialed with a third drug, namely mefloquine.

Piperaquine is characterized by slow absorption and a long biological half-life, making it a good partner drug with artemisinin derivatives which are fast acting but have a short biological half-life.

== Society and culture ==
This product is available in the market of several countries:

- Artekin (Holleykin)
- Eurartesim (Alfasigma; by Good Manufacturing Practices)
- DHP Frimal (Mersifarma TM)
- Diphos (Genix Pharma)
- Timequin (SAMI Pharma )
- Duocotecxin (Holley Pharm)
- Malacur (Elder Pharmaceuticals for SALVAT Laboratories)
- Ridmal (Ajanta Pharma Limited)
