= Tilbroquinol =

Antiprotozoal agent

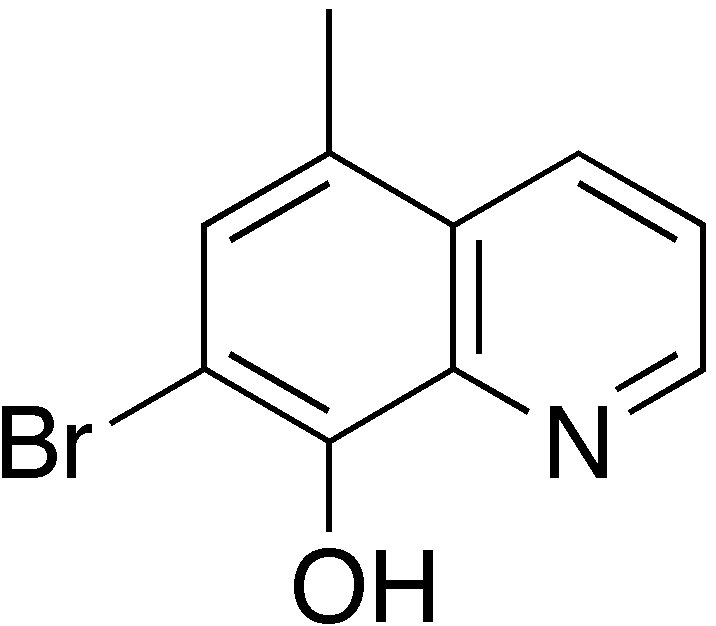

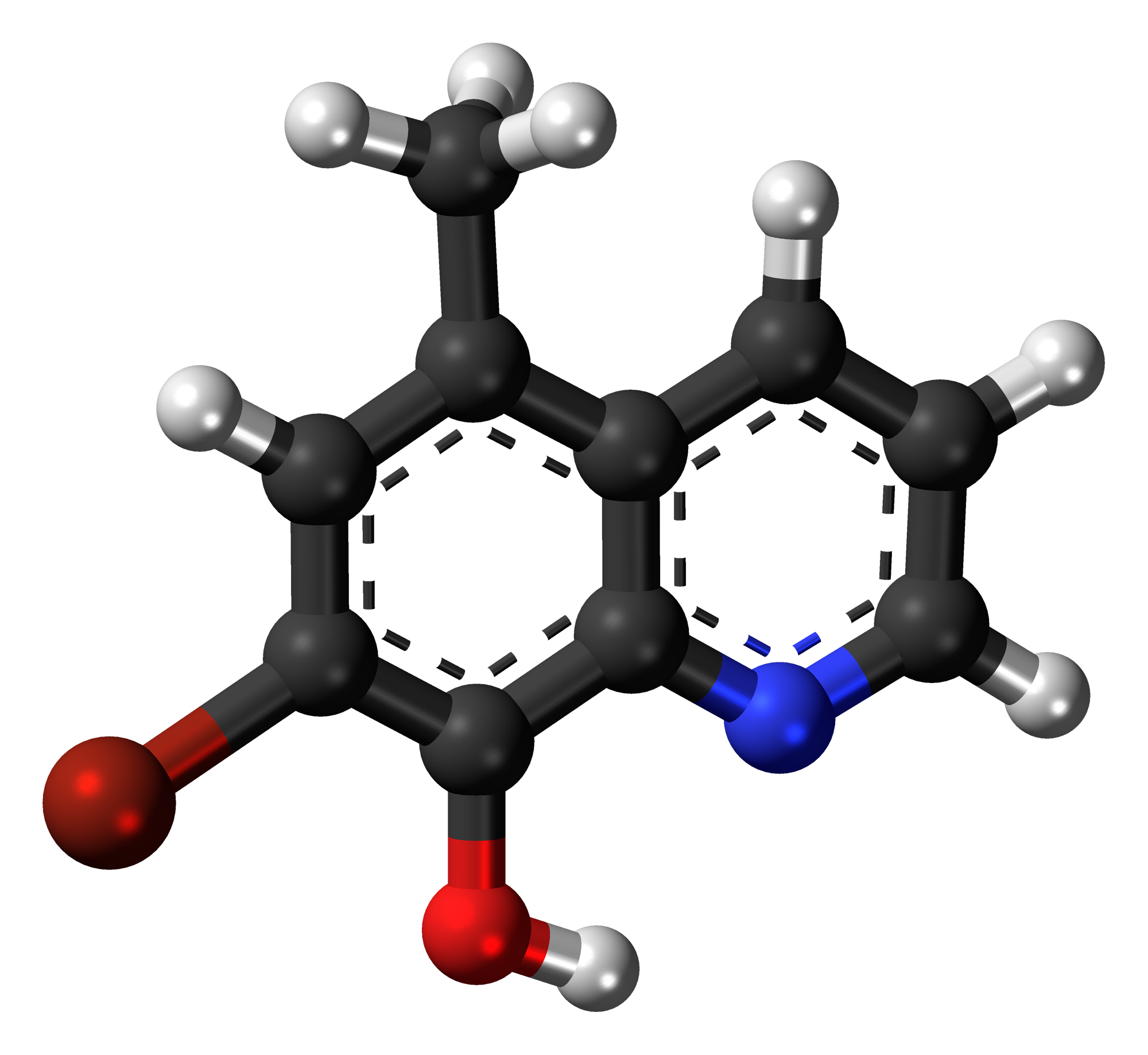

Clinical data
- AHFS/Drugs.com: International Drug Names
- ATC code: P01AA05 (WHO)

Identifiers
- IUPAC name: 7-Bromo-5-methylquinolin-8-ol
- CAS Number: 7175-09-9
- PubChem CID: 65592
- ChemSpider: 59034
- UNII: P6SB125NHA
- KEGG: D07351
- ChEMBL: ChEMBL1788385
- CompTox Dashboard (EPA): DTXSID80221973
- ECHA InfoCard: 100.027.758

Chemical and physical data
- Formula: C_{10}H_{8}BrNO
- Molar mass: 238.084 g·mol^{−1}
- 3D model (JSmol): Interactive image
- SMILES: CC1=CC(=C(C2=C1C=CC=N2)O)Br
- InChI: InChI=1S/C10H8BrNO/c1-6-5-8(11)10(13)9-7(6)3-2-4-12-9/h2-5,13H,1H3; Key:JMOVFFLYGIQXMM-UHFFFAOYSA-N

Tilbroquinol is an antiprotozoal agent effective against amoebiasis. It has also been used against Vibrio cholerae.
