= Amorpha-4,11-diene synthase =

Identifiers
- EC no.: 4.2.3.24

Databases
- IntEnz: IntEnz view
- BRENDA: BRENDA entry
- ExPASy: NiceZyme view
- KEGG: KEGG entry
- MetaCyc: metabolic pathway
- PRIAM: profile
- PDB structures: RCSB PDB PDBe PDBsum
Search
- PMC: articles
- PubMed: articles
- NCBI: proteins

The enzyme amorpha-4,11-diene synthase (EC 4.2.3.24) (ADS) catalyzes the chemical reaction

(2E,6E)-farnesyl diphosphate ⇌ amorpha-4,11-diene + diphosphate

This enzyme belongs to the family of lyases, specifically those carbon-oxygen lyases acting on phosphates. The systematic name of this enzyme class is (2E,6E)-farnesyl-diphosphate diphosphate-lyase (amorpha-4,11-diene-forming). This enzyme is also called amorphadiene synthase.

This enzyme is mainly found in Artemisia annua, a temperate Asian native flowering plant, and ADS catalyzes the first committed step in the antimalarial drug artemisinin synthesis.

== Enzyme Properties ==
=== Physical Properties ===
Amorpha-4,11-diene synthase is a 533 amino acid long protein with a molecular weight of 62.2 kDa and isoelectric point of 5.25.

ADS shows a pH optimum at pH 6.5 and a minimum at pH 7.5.

With Mg^{2+}, Mn^{2+} and Co^{2+} as cofactors, large enzyme activity observed, with Ni^{2+}, low activity observed, and with Cu^{2+} and Zn^{2+}, essentially no activity observed.

=== Evolution ===
ADS is a highly conserved protein similar to other proteins with analogous functionality. The deduced amino acid sequence is 32 to 51% identical with the sequence of other known sesquiterpene cyclases from angiosperms (flowering plants) meaning the enzymes have a common ancestry. More specifically, it has a highly conserved substrate binding site with an aspartate rich DDxxD motif.

=== Expression ===
ADS is expressed 16-fold higher in the leaves than in roots of the Artemisia annua plant and 10-fold higher than in the stems showing a tissue-specific expression pattern.

=== Products ===
While amorpha-4,11-diene is the main project of ADS, the purified enzyme has been shown to produce at least 16 different products. These additional products include the olefins (E)-β-farnesene, amorpha-4,7(11)-diene, γ-humulene and β-sesquiphellandrene, and the oxygenated sesquiterpenes amorpha-4-en-11-ol, amorpha-4-en-7-ol, and α-bisabolol. About 97.5% of the products are olefins and the other 2.5% are oxygenated sesquiterpenes.

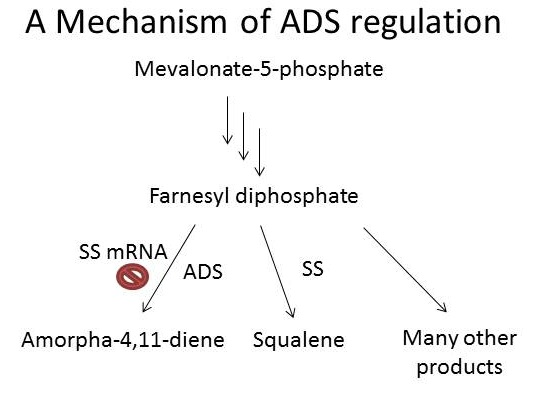
Figure 1: ADS regulation by SS mRNA

=== Regulation ===
Two forms of ADS regulation include environmental induction and biochemical regulatory switches. Under normal conditions, ADS is expressed at low levels in Artemisia annua; however, when exposed to cold, heat shock, or UV light, the ADS becomes upregulated. Corresponding with this in nature, cold-acclimated Artemisia annua express higher levels of ADS than plants under normal conditions.

Regulatory switches help control levels of ADS. Since enzyme substrate Farnesyl diphosphate has many uses in addition to forming amorpha-4,11-diene, these other pathways regulate ADS. One such pathway is sterol biosynthesis, and in fact, the enzyme squalene synthase (SS) is considered a regulatory switch for ADS. When SS cDNA, which reduces SS mRNA concentration and therefore reduces expression of SS, is introduced into the plant cells, mRNA levels of ADS dramatically increased (Figure 1).

== Mechanism ==
ADS catalyzes the reaction of farnesyl diphosphate(FPP) to amorpha-4,11-diene (Figure 2).

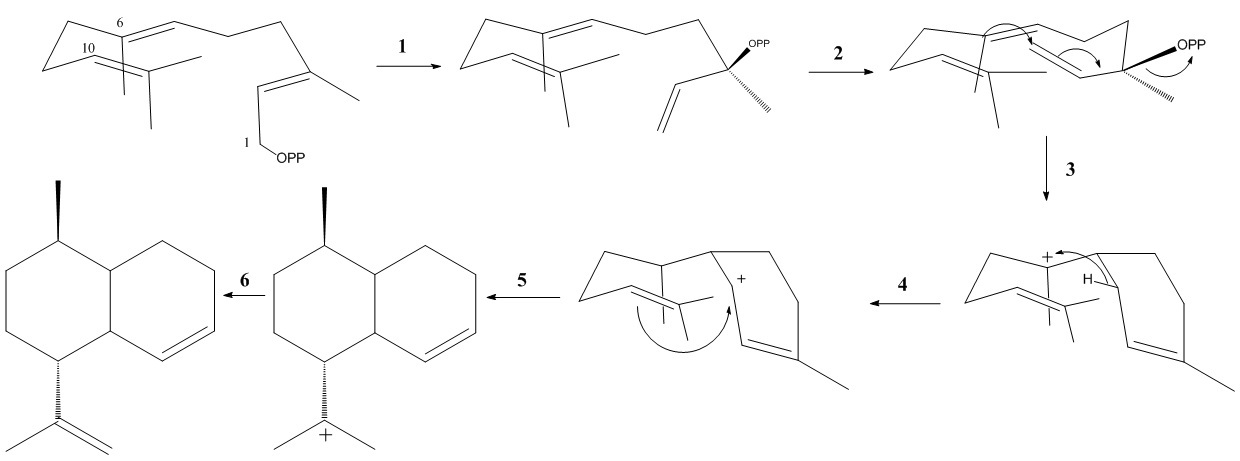
Figure 2: ADS Mechanism

The following reaction mechanism has been supported with experimental data:

1. Isomerization of FPP to (R)-nerolidyl diphosphate (NPP)
2. Ionization of NPP
3. C-1,C-6-ring closure to generate a bisaboyl cation
4. 1,3-hydride shift
5. 1,10-ring closure
6. Deprotonation at either C-12 or C-13

== Industrial applications ==
Amorpha-4-11-diene synthase catalyses the first step in the synthesis of antimalarial drug artemisinin by converting ubiquitous farnesyl diphosphate into the precursor amorpha-4,11-diene. Armorpha-4,11-diene undergoes multiple steps to become artemisinic acid and finally artemisinin (Figure 3).

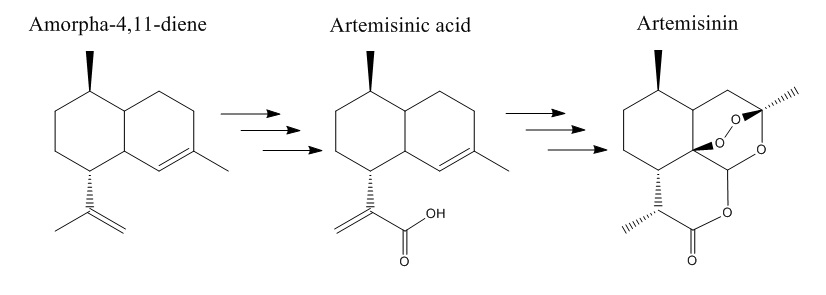
Figure 23 Amorpha-4,11-diene to Artemisinin

Artemisinin is naturally synthesized by the native Chinese plant Artemisia annua; however due to low plant tissue extraction yields and long growing seasons, alternative ways including metabolic engineering to produce artemisinin are being considered. ADS has been cloned and expressed in bacteria cells as a way to produce artemisinin. Because ADS is the first committed and limiting step of artemisinin biosynthesis, increasing ADS levels should increase artemisinin yield. However, ADS is not the only bottle neck in artemisinin production, so additional genes are needed to increase yield. A way to do this has been to increase the flux towards ADS by producing more FPP from the mevalonate pathway. In fact, the over-expression of Amorpha-4-11-diene synthase coupled with expression of yeast's mevalonate pathway has shown to increase yield and production of artemisinin precursor amorpha-4,11-diene.

Scientists from the company Amyris have developed a method for high-level production of artemisinin. One of the synthetic genes in this procedure is ADS from Artemisia annua. The semi-synthetic production of artemisinin by Amyris has the potential to lower the cost of antimalarial treatments thus making them more readily available to the developing world.
