= Clefamide =

Chemical compound

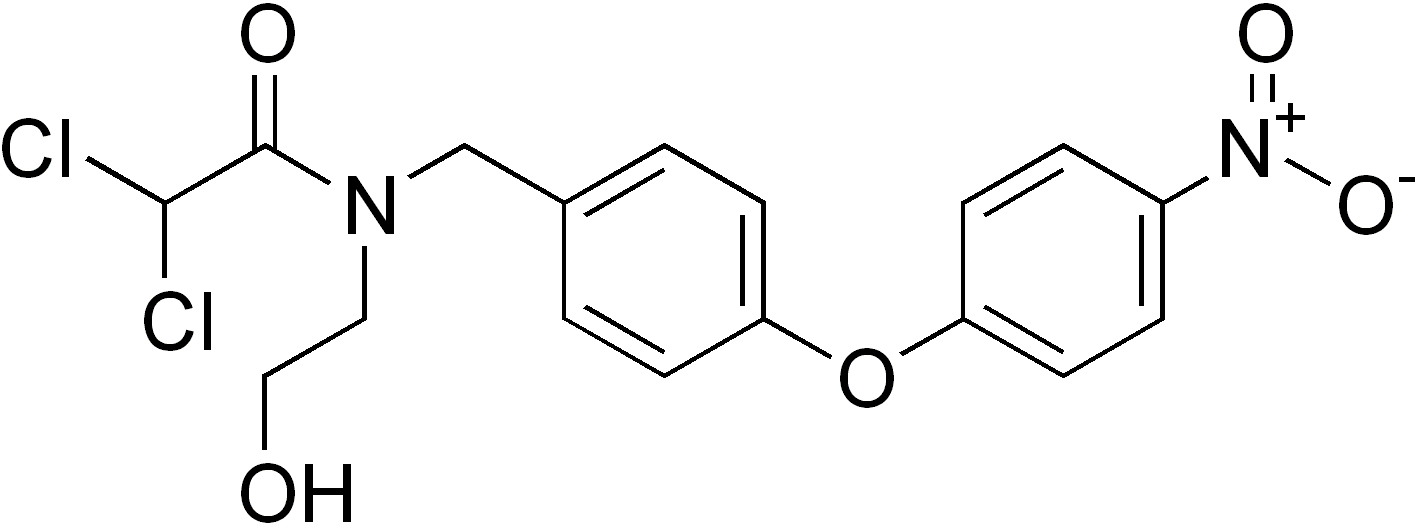

Clinical data
- Trade names: Mebinol
- ATC code: P01AC02 (WHO)

Identifiers
- IUPAC name: 2,2-Dichloro-N-(2-hydroxyethyl)-N-[[4-(4-nitrophenoxy)phenyl]methyl]
- CAS Number: 3576-64-5
- PubChem CID: 71819
- ChemSpider: 64843
- UNII: 4AZ2V8K4EK
- KEGG: D07354
- ChEMBL: ChEMBL1788400
- CompTox Dashboard (EPA): DTXSID30189296
- ECHA InfoCard: 100.020.631

Chemical and physical data
- Formula: C_{17}H_{16}Cl_{2}N_{2}O_{5}
- Molar mass: 399.22 g·mol^{−1}
- 3D model (JSmol): Interactive image
- SMILES: ClC(Cl)C(=O)N(CCO)Cc2ccc(Oc1ccc(cc1)[N+]([O-])=O)cc2
- InChI: InChI=1S/C17H16Cl2N2O5/c18-16(19)17(23)20(9-10-22)11-12-1-5-14(6-2-12)26-15-7-3-13(4-8-15)21(24)25/h1-8,16,22H,9-11H2; Key:ODCUSWJXZDHLKV-UHFFFAOYSA-N

Clefamide (trade name Mebinol) is an antiprotozoal agent that was used to treat amoebiasis in the 1960s. There is no evidence for any later use of the drug.
