= Etofamide =

Chemical compound

Clinical data
- AHFS/Drugs.com: International Drug Names
- Routes of administration: Oral
- ATC code: P01AC03 (WHO)

Legal status
- Legal status: In general: ℞ (Prescription only)

Identifiers
- IUPAC name: 2,2-dichloro-N-(2-ethoxyethyl)-N- [4-(4-nitrophenoxy)benzyl]acetamide
- CAS Number: 25287-60-9
- PubChem CID: 65718
- ChemSpider: 59142
- UNII: 03F36JH21U
- KEGG: D07355
- ChEMBL: ChEMBL1788393
- CompTox Dashboard (EPA): DTXSID40179926
- ECHA InfoCard: 100.042.522

Chemical and physical data
- Formula: C_{19}H_{20}Cl_{2}N_{2}O_{5}
- Molar mass: 427.28 g·mol^{−1}
- 3D model (JSmol): Interactive image
- SMILES: CCOCCN(CC1=CC=C(C=C1)OC2=CC=C(C=C2)[N+](=O)[O-])C(=O)C(Cl)Cl
- InChI: InChI=1S/C19H20Cl2N2O5/c1-2-27-12-11-22(19(24)18(20)21)13-14-3-7-16(8-4-14)28-17-9-5-15(6-10-17)23(25)26/h3-10,18H,2,11-13H2,1H3; Key:QTRALMGDQMIVFF-UHFFFAOYSA-N

Etofamide (INN, also known as eticlordifene) is an antiprotozoal drug used in the treatment of amoebiasis.

Its effect against Giardia lamblia has been described as modest.
