= Tenonitrozole =

Chemical compound

Clinical data
- AHFS/Drugs.com: International Drug Names
- ATC code: P01AX08 (WHO)

Identifiers
- IUPAC name: N-(5-Nitro-1,3-thiazol-2-yl)thiophene-2-carboxamide
- CAS Number: 3810-35-3
- PubChem CID: 19646
- ChemSpider: 18505
- UNII: PBQ7WLE1WP
- KEGG: D07360
- ChEMBL: ChEMBL1082354
- CompTox Dashboard (EPA): DTXSID5046277
- ECHA InfoCard: 100.021.167

Chemical and physical data
- Formula: C_{8}H_{5}N_{3}O_{3}S_{2}
- Molar mass: 255.27 g·mol^{−1}
- 3D model (JSmol): Interactive image
- SMILES: c1cc(sc1)C(=O)Nc2ncc(s2)[N+](=O)[O-]
- InChI: InChI=1S/C8H5N3O3S2/c12-7(5-2-1-3-15-5)10-8-9-4-6(16-8)11(13)14/h1-4H,(H,9,10,12); Key:ZLOXYEZYWCTXHU-UHFFFAOYSA-N

Tenonitrozole is an antiprotozoal agent.
