= Artesunate/pyronaridine =

Combination medication for the treatment of malaria

Combination of
- Artesunate: Antimalarial
- Pyronaridine: Antimalarial

Clinical data
- Trade names: Pyramax
- Other names: Artesunate/pyronaridine tetraphosphate
- Routes of administration: By mouth
- ATC code: P01BF06 (WHO)

Identifiers
- CAS Number: 884661-13-6

Artesunate/pyronaridine, sold under the brand name Pyramax, is a fixed-dose combination medication for the treatment of malaria. It can be used for malaria of both the P. falciparum and P. vivax types. It combines artesunate and pyronaridine. It is taken by mouth.

The combination is generally well tolerated. Side effects may include headache, vomiting, or cough. Use in those with severe liver disease or kidney disease is not recommended. Use is not generally recommended in early pregnancy. However, there are no other options and if treatment may save the mother's life it may be used. The two components work by different mechanisms.

It is on the World Health Organization's List of Essential Medicines.

== Medical uses ==
Artesunate/pyronaridine is used for malaria of both the P. falciparum and P. vivax types. It is not recommended for severe disease.

A 2019 review (updated in 2021) found that the combination compared well to artemether/lumefantrine. Benefits also appear similar to mefloquine together with artesunate. It is not recommended for the prevention of malaria.

== Research for drug repurposing ==
There is some in vitro evidence that suggests artesunate/pyronaridine may be worthy of clinical trial study to determine whether it might have a role as a drug for COVID-19 treatment.
