= Artemisin =

Chemical compound

Names
- Preferred IUPAC name (3S,3aR,4S,5aS,9bS)-4-Hydroxy-3,5a,9-trimethyl-3a,5,5a,9b-tetrahydronaphtho[1,2-b]furan-2,8(3H,4H)-dione

Identifiers
CAS Number	481-05-0
3D model (JSmol)	Interactive image
ChEBI	CHEBI:2852
ChEMBL	ChEMBL158124
ChemSpider	58542
KEGG	C09344
PubChem CID	65030
UNII	Y1R67R7XWU
CompTox Dashboard (EPA)	DTXSID80877833
- InChI: Key: LUHMMHZLDLBAKX-DBIGVJDZSA-N; InChI=1S/C15H18O4/c1-7-9(16)4-5-15(3)6-10(17)11-8(2)14(18)19-13(11)12(7)15/h4-5,8,10-11,13,17H,6H2,1-3H3/t8-,10-,11+,13-,15+/m0/s1
- SMILES: C=1C(=O)C(C)=C2[C@@](C1)(C[C@@H]([C@H]1[C@@H](C(O[C@H]21)=O)C)O)C

Properties
Chemical formula	C_{15}H_{18}O_{4}
Molar mass	262.305 g·mol^{−1}
Melting point	203 °C (397 °F; 476 K)
- Except where otherwise noted, data are given for materials in their standard state (at 25 °C [77 °F], 100 kPa). Infobox references

Artemisin is a sesquiterpene lactone, similar in structure to α-santonin.

== See also ==
- Artemisia (genus), hardy herbaceous plants and shrubs known for the powerful chemical constituents in their essential oils
- Artemisinin, a group of drugs used against malaria
- Santonin, an anthelminthic, drug expelling parasitic worms (helminths) by paralyzing them
