= ATC code P =

Section of ATC Classification for antiparasitics, insecticides, and repellents

ATC code P Antiparasitic products, insecticides and repellents is a section of the Anatomical Therapeutic Chemical Classification System, a system of alphanumeric codes developed by the World Health Organization (WHO) for the classification of drugs and other medical products.

National issues of the ATC classification may include additional codes not present in this list, which follows the WHO version.
