= Tikri, Uttar Pradesh =

Tikri, Uttar Pradesh Tikri
- Town
- Location in Uttar Pradesh, India Tikri, Uttar Pradesh (India)
- Coordinates: 29.23°N 77.35°E
- Country: India
- State: Uttar Pradesh
- District: Baghpat
- Elevation: 233 m (764 ft)

Population (2001)
  - Total: 23,459

Languages
  - Official: Hindi
- Time zone: UTC+5:30 (IST)
- PIN: 250625
- Vehicle registration: UP17
- Website: up.gov.in

Tikri is a town and a nagar panchayat in Baghpat in the Indian state of Uttar Pradesh.

== Geography ==
Tikri is located at 29.23°N 77.35°E. It has an average elevation of 233 metres (764 feet). It is about 25 km away from Baraut.

Tikri Town is situated between Baraut Mujaffarnagar Highway and Delhi Yamnotri National Highway. Big Jain Tample and Pakki Choupal is a point of attraction.

== Demographics ==
As of 2011 India census, Tikri had a population of (voter) 21,548 total population of 31,225. Males constitute 58% of the population and females 42%. Tikri has an average literacy rate of 54.8%, lower than the national average of 58.4%: male literacy is 71.3%, and female literacy is 42%. In Tikri, 16% of the population is under 6 years of age.

== Educational facilities ==
Tikri was an Educational hub in the early 1960s. At that time the only Inter College (Har Chand Mal Jain Inter College) of that area had hostel facilities. HMJIC, Tikri was established in the name of Lala Har Chand Mal Jain ji, an industrialist and social worker of Tikri.
