= Arterolane =

Chemical compound

Clinical data
- Routes of administration: Oral
- ATC code: P01BX02 (WHO) (combination with piperaquine)

Identifiers
- IUPAC name: [(N-(2-amino-2-methylpropyl)-2-cis-dispiro(adamantane-2,3'-[1,2,4]trioxolane-5',1"-cyclohexan)-4"-yl]acetamide
- CAS Number: 664338-39-0
- PubChem CID: 10475633
- ChemSpider: 25069705
- UNII: 3N1TN351VB
- ChEBI: CHEBI:136054
- CompTox Dashboard (EPA): DTXSID50985095

Chemical and physical data
- Formula: C_{22}H_{36}N_{2}O_{4}
- Molar mass: 392.540 g·mol^{−1}
- 3D model (JSmol): Interactive image
- SMILES: CC(C)(N)CN=C(O)C[C@H]1CC[C@]2(CC1)OO[C@]1(O2)[C@H]2C[C@@H]3C[C@H](C2)C[C@H]1C3
- InChI: InChI=1S/C22H36N2O4/c1-20(2,23)13-24-19(25)12-14-3-5-21(6-4-14)26-22(28-27-21)17-8-15-7-16(10-17)11-18(22)9-15/h14-18H,3-13,23H2,1-2H3,(H,24,25)/t14-,15-,16+,17-,18+,21+,22-; Key:VXYZBLXGCYNIHP-SSPKTAKCSA-N

Arterolane, also known as OZ277 or RBx 11160, is an antimalarial compound marketed by Ranbaxy Laboratories. It was discovered by US and European scientists coordinated by the Medicines for Malaria Venture (MMV). Its molecular structure is uncommon for pharmacological compounds in that it has both an ozonide (1,2,4-trioxolane) group and an adamantane substituent.

Initial results were disappointing, and in 2007 MMV withdrew support, after having invested $20M in the research; Ranbaxy said at the time that it intended to continue developing arterolane in combination with another drug. In 2009, Ranbaxy started a Phase II clinical trial of arterolane in combination with piperaquine, and it was published in 2015.

In 2012, Ranbaxy obtained approval to market an arterolane/piperaquine combination drug in India, under the brand name Synriam. In 2014, the product was also approved in Nigeria, Uganda, Senegal, Cameroon, Guinea, Kenya and Ivory Coast.
