= Plasmepsin II =

Enzyme present in Plasmodium

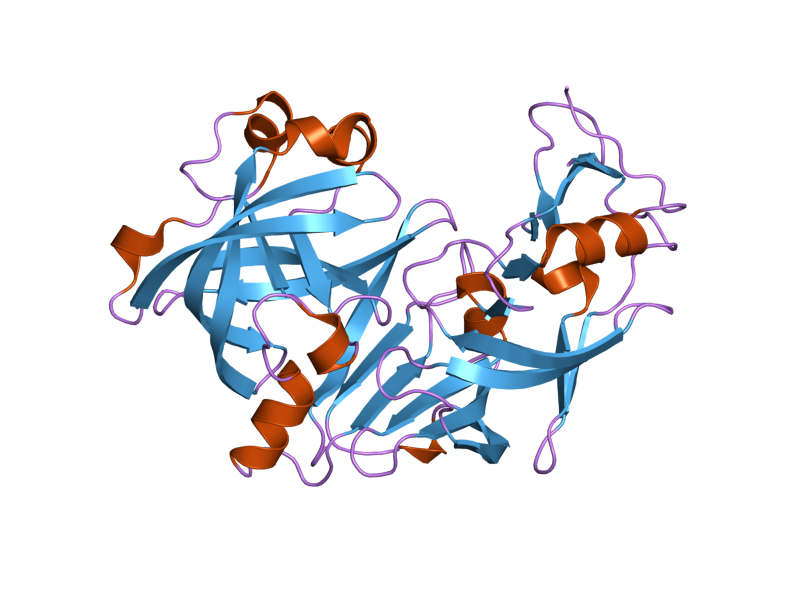

Identifiers
- EC no.: 3.4.23.39
- CAS no.: 159447-18-4

Databases
- IntEnz: IntEnz view
- BRENDA: BRENDA entry
- ExPASy: NiceZyme view
- KEGG: KEGG entry
- MetaCyc: metabolic pathway
- PRIAM: profile
- PDB structures: RCSB PDB PDBe PDBsum
Search
- PMC: articles
- PubMed: articles
- NCBI: proteins

Plasmepsin II (EC 3.4.23.39, aspartic hemoglobinase II, PFAPD) is an enzyme. This enzyme catalyses the following chemical reaction

Hydrolysis of the bonds linking certain hydrophobic residues in hemoglobin or globin. Also cleaves the small molecule substrates such as Ala-Leu-Glu-Arg-Thr-Phe-Phe(NO_{2})-Ser-Phe-Pro-Thr

This enzyme is present in malaria organism, Plasmodium.
