= Amorpha-4,11-diene =

Names
- IUPAC name 6α,7β,10α-Cadina-4,11-diene
- Systematic IUPAC name (1R,4R,4aS,8aR)-4,7-Dimethyl-1-(prop-1-en-2-yl)-1,2,3,4,4a,5,6,8a-octahydronaphthalene

Identifiers
| CAS Number | 92692-39-2 |
| 3D model (JSmol) | Interactive image; Interactive image |
| ChEBI | CHEBI:52026 |
| ChemSpider | 9227908 |
| KEGG | C16028 |
| PubChem CID | 11052747 |
| CompTox Dashboard (EPA) | DTXSID50239106 |
- InChI: InChI=1S/C15H24/c1-10(2)13-8-6-12(4)14-7-5-11(3)9-15(13)14/h9,12-15H,1,5-8H2,2-4H3/t12-,13+,14+,15-/m1/s1 Key: HMTAHNDPLDKYJT-CBBWQLFWSA-N; InChI=1/C15H24/c1-10(2)13-8-6-12(4)14-7-5-11(3)9-15(13)14/h9,12-15H,1,5-8H2,2-4H3/t12-,13+,14+,15-/m1/s1 Key: HMTAHNDPLDKYJT-CBBWQLFWBG
- SMILES: C[C@@H]1CC[C@H]([C@@H]2[C@H]1CCC(=C2)C)C(=C)C; C\1(=C\[C@@H]2[C@H](C(=C)\C)CC[C@@H](C)[C@@H]2CC/1)C

Properties
| Chemical formula | C_{15}H_{24} |
| Molar mass | 204.35 g/mol |
| Density | 0.869 g/ml |
- Except where otherwise noted, data are given for materials in their standard state (at 25 °C [77 °F], 100 kPa). verify (what is ?) Infobox references

Amorpha-4,11-diene is a precursor to artemisinin.

== See also ==
- Amorpha-4,11-diene synthase
