= Artemotil =

Chemical compound

Clinical data
- AHFS/Drugs.com: International Drug Names
- Pregnancy category: not available
- Routes of administration: Intramuscular injection
- ATC code: P01BE04 (WHO)

Pharmacokinetic data
- Metabolism: Hepatic
- Elimination half-life: 20 hours

Identifiers
- IUPAC name: (5aS,6R,8aS,9R,10S,12R,12aR)-10-ethoxy-3,6,9-trimethyldecahydro-3,12-epoxy[1,2]dioxepino[4,3-i]isochromene
- CAS Number: 75887-54-6
- PubChem CID: 3000469
- ChemSpider: 2272064
- UNII: XGL7GFB9YI
- ChEMBL: ChEMBL301267

Chemical and physical data
- Formula: C_{17}H_{28}O_{5}
- Molar mass: 312.406 g·mol^{−1}
- 3D model (JSmol): Interactive image
- SMILES: CCO[C@@H]1[C@@H]([C@@H]2CC[C@H]([C@H]3[C@]24[C@H](O1)O[C@@](CC3)(OO4)C)C)C
- InChI: InChI=1S/C17H28O5/c1-5-18-14-11(3)13-7-6-10(2)12-8-9-16(4)20-15(19-14)17(12,13)22-21-16/h10-15H,5-9H2,1-4H3/t10-,11-,12+,13+,14+,15-,16-,17-/m1/s1; Key:NLYNIRQVMRLPIQ-XQLAAWPRSA-N

Artemotil (INN; also known as β-arteether), is a fast acting blood schizonticide specifically indicated for the treatment of chloroquine-resistant Plasmodium falciparum malaria and cerebral malaria cases. It is a semi-synthetic derivative of artemisinin, a natural product of the Chinese plant Artemisia annua. It is currently only used as a second line drug in severe cases of malaria.
