= Piperaquine =

Chemical compound

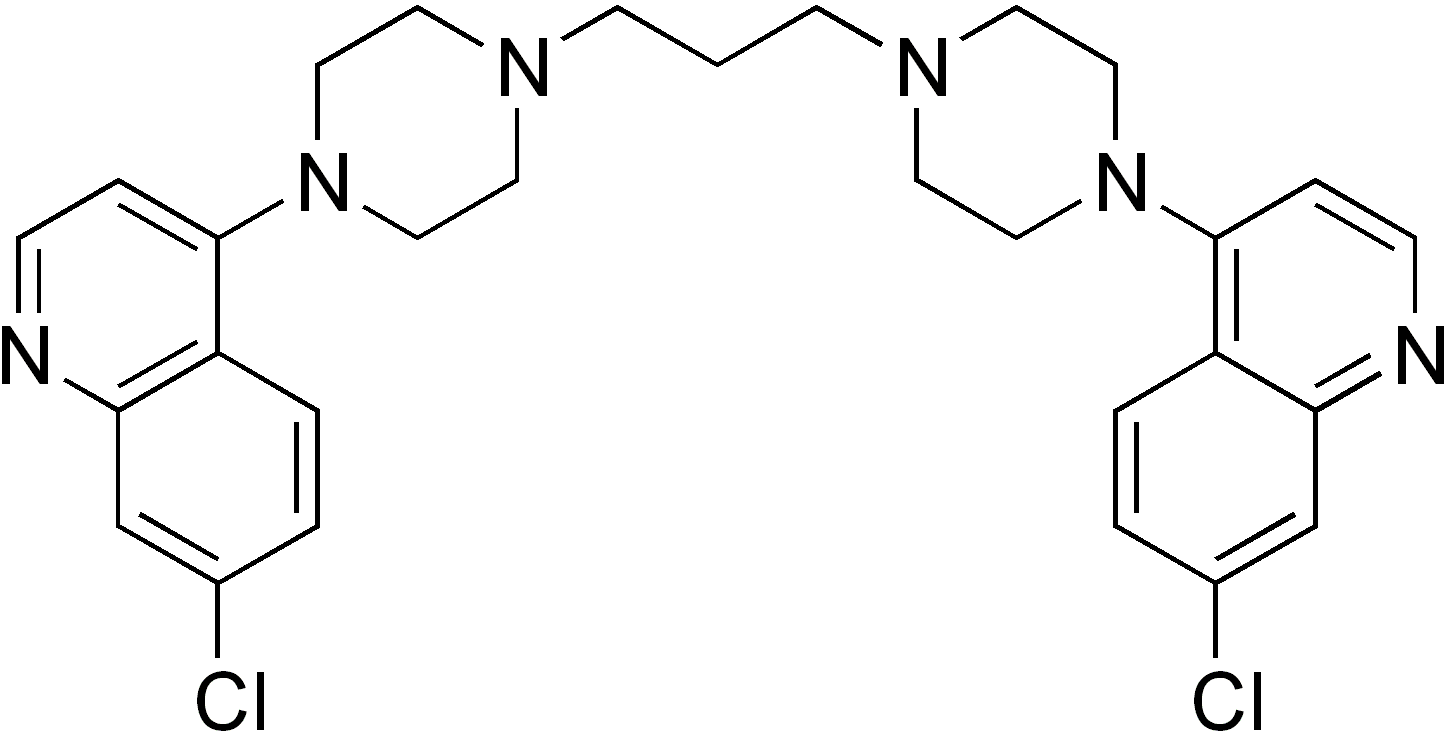

Clinical data
- ATC code: P01BF05 (WHO) (combination with artenimol), P01BX02 (WHO) (combination with arterolane)

Identifiers
- IUPAC name: 1,3-bis[4-(7-chloroquinolin-4-yl)piperazin-1-yl]propane
- CAS Number: 4085-31-8
- PubChem CID: 122262
- DrugBank: DB13941
- ChemSpider: 109031
- UNII: A0HV2Q956Y
- KEGG: D13090
- ChEBI: CHEBI:91231
- ChEMBL: ChEMBL303933
- CompTox Dashboard (EPA): DTXSID00193825

Chemical and physical data
- Formula: C_{29}H_{32}Cl_{2}N_{6}
- Molar mass: 535.52 g·mol^{−1}
- 3D model (JSmol): Interactive image
- Melting point: 199 to 204 °C (390 to 399 °F) (dec.V
- SMILES: Clc1ccc2c(N3CCN(CCCN4CCN(c5ccnc6cc(Cl)ccc56)CC4)CC3)ccnc2c1
- InChI: InChI=1S/C29H32Cl2N6/c30-22-2-4-24-26(20-22)32-8-6-28(24)36-16-12-34(13-17-36)10-1-11-35-14-18-37(19-15-35)29-7-9-33-27-21-23(31)3-5-25(27)29/h2-9,20-21H,1,10-19H2; Key:UCRHFBCYFMIWHC-UHFFFAOYSA-N

Piperaquine is an antiparasitic drug used in combination with dihydroartemisinin to treat malaria. Piperaquine was developed under the Chinese National Malaria Elimination Programme in the 1960s and was adopted throughout China as a replacement for the structurally similar antimalarial drug chloroquine. Due to widespread parasite resistance to piperaquine, the drug fell out of use as a monotherapy, and is instead used as a partner drug for artemisinin combination therapy. Piperaquine kills parasites by disrupting the detoxification of host heme.

== Medical uses ==
Piperaquine is used in combination with dihydroartemisinin for the treatment of malaria. This combination is one of several artemisinin combination therapies recommended by the World Health Organization for treatment of uncomplicated malaria. This combination is also recommended by the World Health Organization for treatment of severe malaria after administration of artesunate.

Piperaquine is also registered for use in some countries in combination with arterolane. However, this combination is not recommended by the World Health Organization due to insufficient data.

== Contraindications ==
Like chloroquine, piperaquine can prolong the QT interval. Although large randomized clinical trials have not revealed evidence of cardiotoxicity, the World Health Organization recommends not using piperaquine in patients with congenital QT prolongation or who are on other drugs that prolong the QT interval.

== Pharmacology ==
=== Mechanism of action ===
Like chloroquine, piperaquine is thought to function by accumulating in the parasite digestive vacuole and interfering with the detoxification of heme into hemozoin.

=== Resistance ===
Parasites that survive piperaquine treatment have been increasingly reported since 2010, particularly in Southeast Asia. The epicenter of piperaquine resistance appears to be western Cambodia where in 2014 over 40% of dihydroartemisinin-piperaquine treatments failed to eliminate parasites from the patient's blood. Characterizing piperaquine-resistant parasites has been technically challenging, as parasites that survive piperaquine treatment in patients appear to remain sensitive to piperaquine in vitro; i.e. piperaquine appears to have the same IC_{50} in sensitive parasites and resistant parasites.

The mechanism by which parasites become resistant to piperaquine remains unclear. Amplification of the parasite proteases plasmepsin 2 and plasmepsin 3, both involved in degrading host hemoglobin, is associated with resistance to piperaquine. Similarly, mutations in a gene related to chloroquine resistance, PfCRT, have been associated with piperaquine resistance; however, parasites that are resistant to chloroquine remain sensitive to piperaquine. In contrast, amplification of the gene for the parasite transporter PfMDR1, a mechanism of parasite resistance to mefloquine, is inversely correlated with piperaquine resistance.

=== Pharmacokinetics ===
Piperaquine is a lipophilic drug and therefore is rapidly absorbed and distributed across much of the body. The drug reaches its maximal concentrations approximately 2 hours after administration.

== Chemistry ==
Piperaquine is available as a base, and as a water-soluble tetraphosphate salt.

== History ==
Piperaquine was discovered in the 1960s by two separate groups working independently of one another: the Shanghai Pharmaceutical Industry Research Institute in China and the Rhone Poulenc in France. In the 1970s and 1980s piperaquine became the primary antimalarial drug of the Chinese National Malaria Control Programme due to increased parasite resistance to chloroquine. By the late 1980s, the use of piperaquine as an antimalarial monotherapy diminished as increasing parasite resistance to piperaquine was observed. Beginning in the 1990s, piperaquine was tested and adopted as a partner drug for artemisinin combination therapy.
