= Dichloroacetamide =

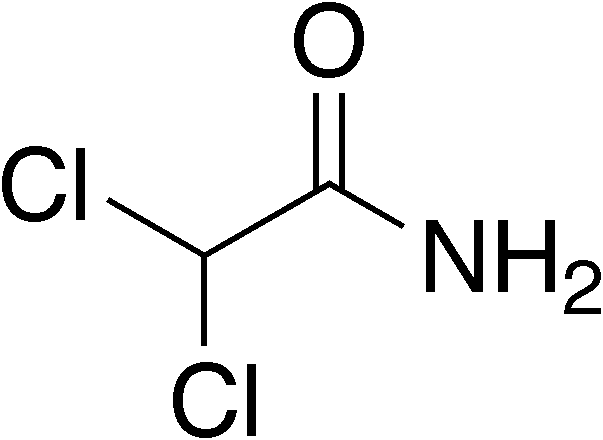

Names
- Preferred IUPAC name 2,2-Dichloroacetamide

Identifiers
CAS Number	683-72-7
3D model (JSmol)	Interactive image
ChemSpider	12173
ECHA InfoCard	100.010.614
EC Number	211-674-2
PubChem CID	12694
UNII	I202LTA03D
CompTox Dashboard (EPA)	DTXSID8021561
- InChI: InChI=1S/C2H3Cl2NO/c3-1(4)2(5)6/h1H,(H2,5,6) Key: WCGGWVOVFQNRRS-UHFFFAOYSA-N; InChI=1/C2H3Cl2NO/c3-1(4)2(5)6/h1H,(H2,5,6) Key: WCGGWVOVFQNRRS-UHFFFAOYAX
- SMILES: ClC(Cl)C(=O)N

Properties
Chemical formula	C_{2}H_{3}Cl_{2}NO
Molar mass	127.95732
Melting point	98 to 100 °C (208 to 212 °F; 371 to 373 K)
Boiling point	233 to 234 °C (451 to 453 °F; 506 to 507 K) (745 mmHg)

Hazards
- GHS labelling
Pictograms	(GHS07: Exclamation mark)
Signal word	Warning
Hazard statements	H315, H319, H335
Precautionary statements	P261, P264, P271, P280, P302+P352, P304+P340, P305+P351+P338, P312, P321, P332+P313, P337+P313, P362, P403+P233, P405, P501
- Except where otherwise noted, data are given for materials in their standard state (at 25 °C [77 °F], 100 kPa). verify (what is ?) Infobox references

Dichloroacetamide is a chlorinated derivative of acetamide.
