= Pyronaridine =

Chemical compound

Clinical data
- Other names: Pyronaridine tetraphosphate
- Routes of administration: Oral, intramuscular injection, intravenous therapy
- ATC code: none

Legal status
- Legal status: CLP (EU): Acute Tox. 3(H301), Eye Dam. 1 (H318), Repr. 2 (H361), Aquatic Chronic 4 (H413)

Identifiers
- IUPAC name: 4-[(7-Chloro-2-methoxy-pyrido[3,2-b]quinolin-10-yl)amino]-2,6-bis(pyrrolidin-1-ylmethyl)phenol
- CAS Number: 74847-35-1
- PubChem CID: 5485198
- ChemSpider: 10647812
- UNII: TD3P7Q3SG6
- ChEMBL: ChEMBL35228
- CompTox Dashboard (EPA): DTXSID60996354

Chemical and physical data
- Formula: C_{29}H_{32}ClN_{5}O_{2}
- Molar mass: 518.06 g·mol^{−1}
- 3D model (JSmol): Interactive image
- SMILES: Clc1ccc6c(c1)nc2ccc(OC)nc2c6Nc5cc(CN3CCCC3)c(O)c(CN4CCCC4)c5
- InChI: InChI=1S/C29H32ClN5O2/c1-37-26-9-8-24-28(33-26)27(23-7-6-21(30)16-25(23)32-24)31-22-14-19(17-34-10-2-3-11-34)29(36)20(15-22)18-35-12-4-5-13-35/h6-9,14-16,36H,2-5,10-13,17-18H2,1H3,(H,31,32); Key:DJUFPMUQJKWIJB-UHFFFAOYSA-N

Pyronaridine is an antimalarial drug. It was first made in 1970 and has been in clinical use in China since the 1980s.

In a small (n=88) malaria study in Cameroon, pyronaridine had a 100% cure rate, compared with 60% for chloroquine.

It is one of the components of the artemisinin combination therapy pyronaridine/artesunate (Pyramax).

It has also been studied as a potential anticancer drug, and treatment for Ebola. The combination of pyronaridine and artesunate has been evaluated to have a synergistic effect of stronger antiviral effect and less toxicity. The combination of pyronaridine and artesunate is being studied as a possible treatment for moderate to severe SARS-COV-2.
