= Artesunate/sulfadoxine/pyrimethamine =

Combination of
- Artesunate: Antimalarial
- Sulfadoxine: Sulfonamide antimalarial
- Pyrimethamine: Antimalarial

Artesunate/sulfadoxine/pyrimethamine is an artesunate-based oral medication used to treat malaria. It consists of artesunate and sulfadoxine/pyrimethamine.
