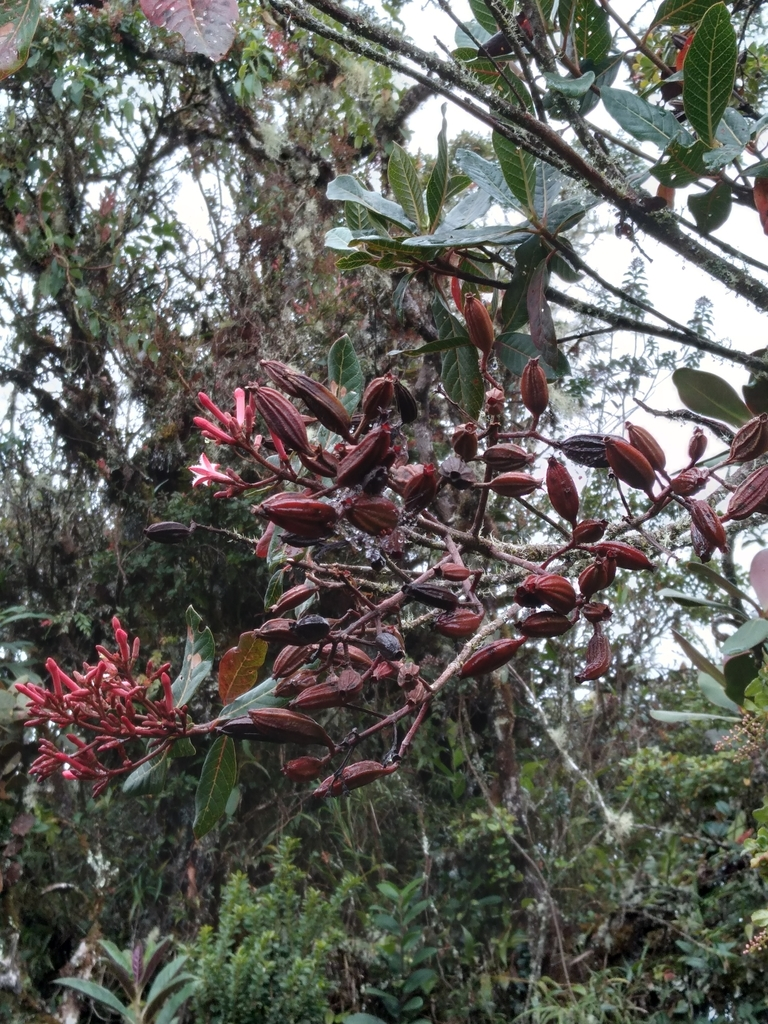

Conservation status
- Endangered (IUCN 3.1)

Scientific classification
- Kingdom: Plantae
- Clade: Embryophytes
- Clade: Tracheophytes
- Clade: Spermatophytes
- Clade: Angiosperms
- Clade: Eudicots
- Clade: Asterids
- Order: Gentianales
- Family: Rubiaceae
- Genus: Cinchona
- Species: C. anderssonii

Binomial name
- Cinchona anderssonii Mald.

= Cinchona anderssonii =

Species of flowering plant

Cinchona anderssonii is a species of flowering plant in the family Rubiaceae. It is a shrub or tree, with two types of flowers, and capsule fruits. The leaves have small chambers for arthropods.

Cinchona anderssonii is endemic to Bolivia, and is listed as Endangered by the IUCN. It was described in 2017, and named after the botanist Lennart Andersson.

== Taxonomy ==
The species was described by Carla Maldonado in 2017.

The type locality is in Madidi National Park, La Paz, Bolivia.

== Distribution ==
Cinchona anderssonii is endemic to the Yungas region of Bolivia. The species grows in cloud forests, at elevations of 2,250–2,600 metres (7,380–8,530 ft). It is known from two locations - Pelechuco, and the Cochabamba Department.

== Description ==
Cinchona anderssonii is a shrub or tree up to 12 metres (39 ft) tall. The bark turns red when damaged, and has a bitter taste.

The leaves are elliptical, glossy on the upper surface, 5.5–13.5 centimetres (2.2–5.3 in) long, and 2.5–5.5 centimetres (0.98–2.17 in) wide. They are leathery when fresh, and papery when dry. The leaf stems are 0.7–3.1 centimetres (0.28–1.22 in) long. The leaves have domatia (small chambers that may be occupied by arthropods).

The inflorescences are panicles. The flowers have two forms. One form has short styles, and the other has long styles.

The short-styled flowers have an ellipsoid hypanthium, which is 1.5–2 millimetres (0.059–0.079 in) long, and 0.8–1.2 millimetres (0.031–0.047 in) long. The calyx is 1.5–2.3 millimetres (0.059–0.091 in) long. The calyx has triangular lobes, which are 0.7–1.8 millimetres (0.028–0.071 in) long. The corolla is pinkish, and has a 11–13 millimetres (0.43–0.51 in) tube. The corolla has five triangular lobes, which are 4.8–5.2 millimetres (0.19–0.20 in) long.

The long-styled flowers are not known. Flowering specimens have been collected in May and June.

The fruits are ellipsoid capsules, which are 8–25.5 millimetres (0.31–1.00 in) long, and 4.5–11 millimetres (0.18–0.43 in) wide. The capsules are dehiscent, and the valves open when dry. The seeds are 8.1–11.2 millimetres (0.32–0.44 in) long, and 2.5–3.3 millimetres (0.098–0.130 in) wide. The endocarp is papery, and 0.2–0.4 millimetres (0.0079–0.0157 in) thick.

Cinchona anderssonii is similar to Cinchona macrocalyx, though the species differ in the details of their leaves and capsules. C. anderssonii is also similar to Cinchona krauseana, though C. krauseana has smaller seeds, and lacks domatia. C. anderssonii is similar to Cinchona hirsuta, though the domatia are in different locations in each species.

== Phytochemistry ==
Cinchona anderssonii contains alkaloids, which may have anti-malarial properties.

== Conservation ==
In 2022, the IUCN assessed Cinchona anderssonii as Endangered. It is threatened by habitat loss and mining.

== Names ==
The specific epithet is in honour of the Swedish botanist Lennart Andersson, who wrote a monograph on Cinchona.

In Spanish, the species is known as Quina.
