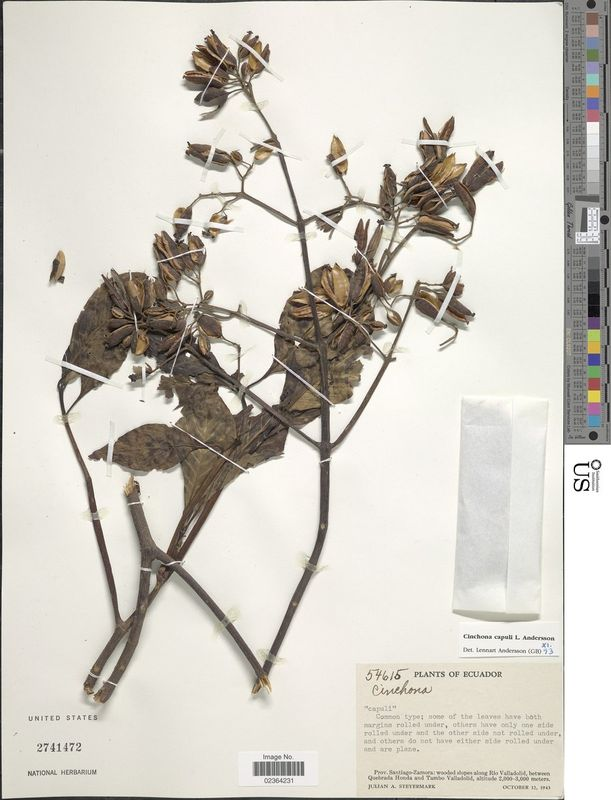

Conservation status
- Near Threatened (IUCN 3.1)

Scientific classification
- Kingdom: Plantae
- Clade: Embryophytes
- Clade: Tracheophytes
- Clade: Angiosperms
- Clade: Eudicots
- Clade: Asterids
- Order: Gentianales
- Family: Rubiaceae
- Genus: Cinchona
- Species: C. capuli

Binomial name
- Cinchona capuli L.Andersson

= Cinchona capuli =

Species of flowering plant

Cinchona capuli is a species of flowering plant in the family Rubiaceae. It is a tree with papery leaves, reddish flowers, and capsule fruits. The species is native to Ecuador.

Cinchona capuli was described in 1994, and is listed as Near Threatened by the IUCN.

== Taxonomy ==
The species was described by Bengt Lennart Andersson in 1994.

== Distribution ==
Cinchona capuli is native to the wet tropical biome of central and southern Ecuador. It grows in the eastern Andes, at elevations of 900–3,000 metres (3,000–9,800 ft).

== Description ==
Cinchona capuli is a tree. It grows up to 18 metres (59 ft) high, and 40 centimetres (16 in) wide at breast height.

The leaves are thin, elliptical to obovate, papery when dry, 6.1–21 centimetres (2.4–8.3 in) long, and 2.6–6.2 centimetres (1.0–2.4 in) wide. The leaves have domatia. The leaf stems are 1–1–2.2 centimetres (0.39–0.39–0.87 in) long.

The calyx is 1.8–2.5 millimetres (0.071–0.098 in) long, and has 0.6–0.9 millimetres (0.024–0.035 in) long lobes. The corolla is a reddish tube, measuring 8.2–9.2 millimetres (0.32–0.36 in) long. The corolla has 3.8–4.6 millimetres (0.15–0.18 in) long lobes.

The fruits is a dehiscent, more or less cylindrical capsule, measuring 13–30 millimetres (0.51–1.18 in) long, and 5–6 millimetres (0.20–0.24 in) wide. The endocarp is papery. The seeds are 7.3–8.5 millimetres (0.29–0.33 in) long, and 0.8–2.3 millimetres (0.031–0.091 in) wide.

Cinchona capuli is similar to Cinchona pubescens, Cinchona barbacoensis, or Cinchona lancifolia.

== Conservation ==
In 2024, the IUCN assessed Cinchona capuli as Near Threatened.

== Nomenclature ==
In Spanish, the species is known as Hoja de capulí.
