= Cinchona pyrifolia =

Conservation status
- Vulnerable (IUCN 3.1)

Scientific classification
- Kingdom: Plantae
- Clade: Tracheophytes
- Clade: Angiosperms
- Clade: Eudicots
- Clade: Asterids
- Order: Gentianales
- Family: Rubiaceae
- Genus: Cinchona
- Species: C. pyrifolia

Binomial name
- Cinchona pyrifolia L.Andersson

Species of flowering plant

Cinchona pyrifolia is a species of flowering plant in the family Rubiaceae. It is a tree with papery leaves, pink or purple flowers, and dehiscent capsule fruits. The species is native to Peru.

Cinchona pyrifolia was described in 1998, and is listed as Vulnerable by the IUCN.

== Taxonomy ==
The species was described by Bengt Lennart Andersson in 1998.

== Distribution ==
Cinchona pyrifolia is native to the wet tropical biome of Huánuco, Peru. It grows in cloud forests, at elevations of 2,227–2,500 metres (7,306–8,202 ft).

== Description ==
Cinchona pyrifolia is a tree. It grows up to 12 metres (39 ft) tall, and around 25 centimetres (9.8 in) wide.

The leaves are elliptical to obovate, papery when dry, 6.9–19 centimetres (2.7–7.5 in) long, and 2.2–8.3 centimetres (0.87–3.27 in) wide. The leaf stems are 1.2–3.3 centimetres (0.47–1.30 in) long.

The calyx is 2.8–3.2 millimetres (0.11–0.13 in) long, and has 0.8–0.9 millimetres (0.031–0.035 in) long lobes. The corolla is pink or purple, and has a 7.1–7.6 millimetres (0.28–0.30 in) long tube, and 2–2.3 millimetres (0.079–0.091 in) long lobes.

The fruit is a dehiscent, more or less ellipsoid capsule measuring 7–21 millimetres (0.28–0.83 in) long, and 4–5 millimetres (0.16–0.20 in) long. The endocarp is papery, and around 0.2 millimetres (0.0079 in) thick. The seeds are 5.1–5.7 millimetres (0.20–0.22 in) long, and 1.2–1.7 millimetres (0.047–0.067 in) wide.

Cinchona pyrifolia is similar to Cinchona lucumifolia and Cinchona lancifolia.

== Conservation ==
In 2014, the IUCN assessed Cinchona pyrifolia as Vulnerable. It is threatened by habitat loss.
