= Cinchona cultivation in British India =

British colonial cultivation program

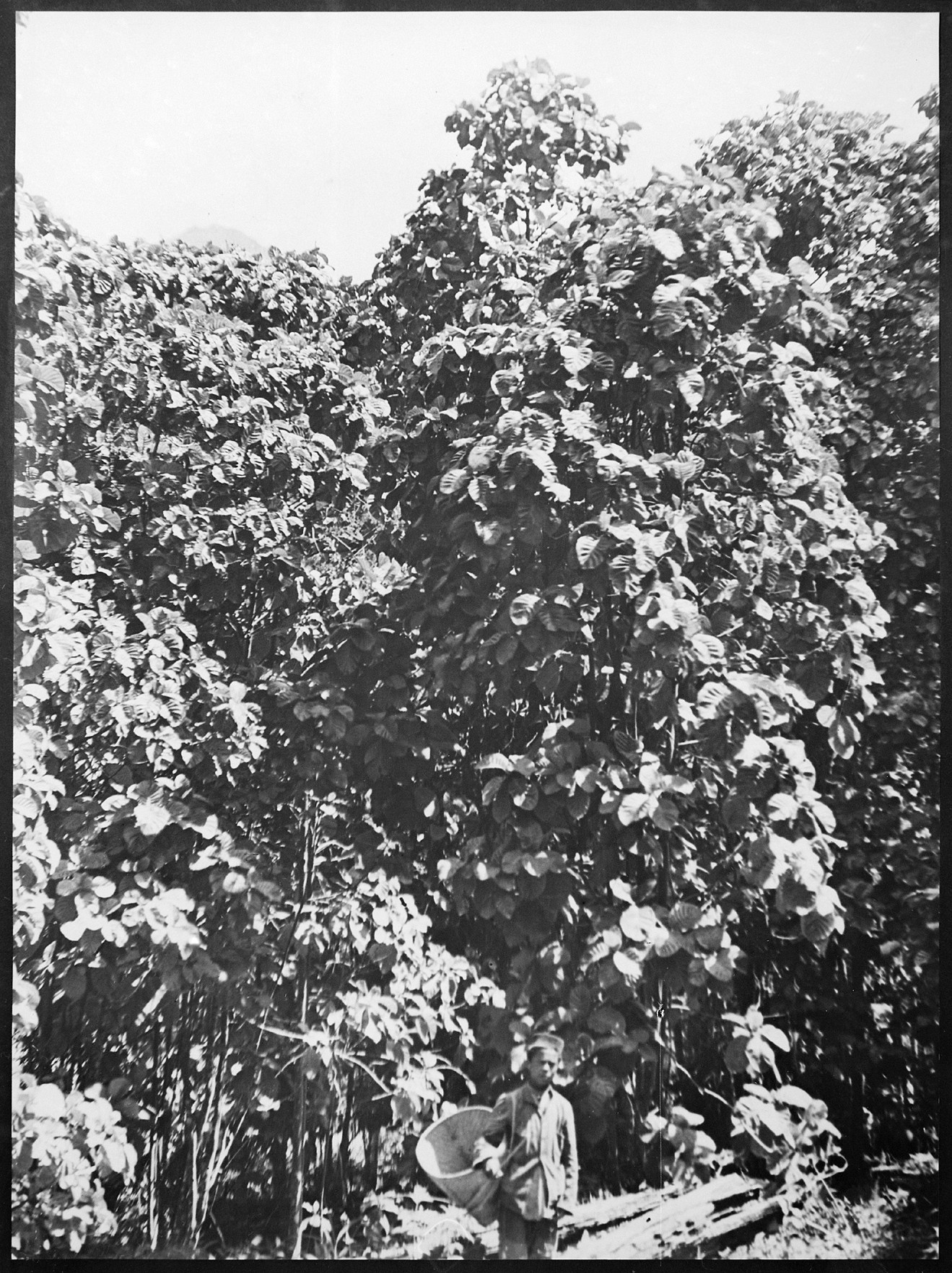
Cinchona trees at the government plantation at Munsong in the eastern Himalayas

Cinchona cultivation in British India was a government-directed program that aimed to establish plantations of South American cinchona trees in the Indian subcontinent. This would allow them to manufacture cinchona alkaloids, particularly quinine, to treat malaria. Beginning in 1859, it produced two main plantation and factory systems: one in the Nilgiri Hills of the Madras Presidency and another around Mungpoo in the Darjeeling district of the Bengal Presidency. The program was an effort to secure a cheaper supply of antimalarial medicine for colonial India.

Officials presented the idea as a humanitarian project that would give an effective malaria treatment to India's poor. However, in practice, it would benefit the health of colonial troops and officials and reduce government dependence on imported bark, while supporting British rule in malarial regions. From 1860-61, Clements Markham led expeditions to bring living plants and seeds from the Andes region to India. Botanists including William Graham McIvor and Thomas Anderson then tested the viability of different species across southern India and the eastern Himalayas. By the mid-1860s, government plantations were created in both regions, and further trial runs were being held in other hill districts.

The plantations failed to make India self-sufficient in quinine. The British program favored the production of inexpensive mixed alkaloids, whereas the competing industry in Dutch Java developed high-quinine strains and had a more tightly integrated commercial system, resulting in cheaper goods. Due to this, Java dominated the world bark market by the early twentieth century, and India remained a large consumer and importer of it. In Bengal, quinine from Mungpoo was sold in one-pice packets through post offices and other local agents from the 1890s, creating an extensive state drug-distribution network.

After Indian independence in 1947, the government of West Bengal inherited the rights to the eastern plantations. Modern synthetic antimalarials and insecticides took favor over quinine usage, but the parts of the public-sector industry as well as some plantations survived.

== Background ==
The bark of cinchona trees, traditionally native to the Andean regions of South America, had been used in Europe against intermittent fevers ever since the seventeenth century. In 1820, the French chemists Pierre Joseph Pelletier and Joseph Bienaimé Caventou isolated quinine and cinchonine from the bark. Quinine's subsequent commercial production increased demand for cinchona bark and made the chemical assay of bark important to traders and manufacturers. By the 1850s, European officials and botanists feared that destructive harvesting and unstable supplies in South America would limit access to medicine which was increasingly becoming necessary to colonial armies and administrations.

Both the Dutch and British governments made attempts to move cinchona out of the Andes. These attempts formed part of a wider nineteenth-century system in which botanical gardens collected and redistributed economically useful plants. Kew Gardens in South London served as the metropolitan center of the British network. Its directors advised the India Office, received specimens, organized their onward shipment and remained involved in the Indian cultivation program. India had already been used for experiments with imported crops such as tea; cinchona would be a crop that served a medical purpose.

The British medical official John Forbes Royle urged the government in 1852 and again in 1857 to introduce quinine-yielding cinchona to India. He argued that plantations would reduce expenditure and enable government to sell a cheap febrifuge. The policy was often initially described as non-commercial and benevolent, but its first beneficiaries primarily included British troops and colonial servants, as their vulnerability to malaria carried military and fiscal costs. The historian V. R. Muraleedharan described effective treatment and humanitarian ideals as linked but ultimately unfulfilled aims of the colonial "cinchona policy".

== Transfer and establishment ==
=== South American expeditions ===
In 1859, the India Office placed Clements Markham in charge of an expedition to the Andes to acquire cinchona plants and seeds. Because Markham was not a trained botanist, Kew Gardens recruited Richard Spruce and the gardener Robert Cross to assist him; G. J. Pritchett worked separately in Peru. They sought out many types of bark tree across Peru, Bolivia and Ecuador, mainly relying on local cultivators and collectors. Simultaneously, they had to work against efforts by South American governments to restrict the export of seeds. Kew was the main staging point for the recovered specimens, which were carried in Wardian cases to London by sea.

Transit mortality of the plants was high. Four hundred Cinchona calisaya plants collected by Markham reached Ootacamund, India but died shortly. A shipment associated with Cross and Spruce ended up going better: 463 red-bark plants, then called C. succirubra, and six C. calisaya reached Ootacamund on April 9, 1861. These plants formed the basis for many of the southern Indian experiments. Plants continued to circulate among Kew, India, Ceylon and Java throughout the 1860s.

Thomas Anderson, the superintendent of the Calcutta Botanic Garden, visited the Dutch plantations in Java in 1861. He examined their climates and methods and reported 40,000 seeds and 412 plants of C. calisaya, C. pahudiana and C. lancifolia. Trade continued in both directions: the Javanese government sent plants and large consignments of seed to British India, while Indian plantations later supplied material and trained staff to other proposed growing regions.

=== Nilgiri and Bengal plantations ===
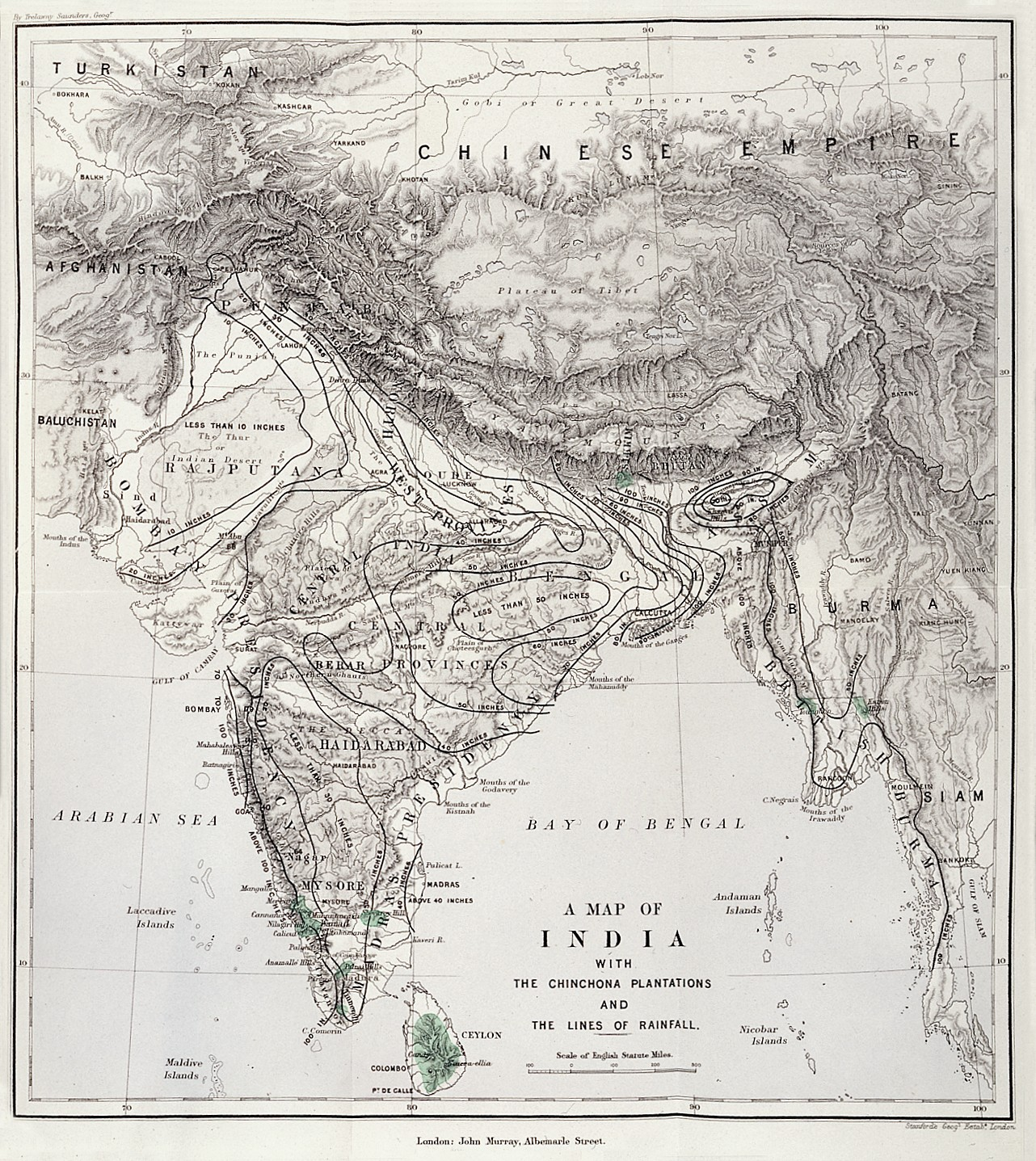
Map showing cinchona-growing areas in southern India, Bengal and Ceylon against lines of rainfall

William Graham McIvor, superintendent of the government garden at Ootacamund, prepared the primary southern cinchona reception station. Experimental planting extended across the Nilgiri Mountains to Dodabetta, Neddivattam, Avalanche and Malkoondah, and to prospective sites in Coorg and the Annamalai Hills. Markham and Anderson disagreed over whether exposed highland sites or shaded forest best replicated Andean conditions, resulting in both types of sites being considered. By 1871, the four government Nilgiri sites at Dodabetta, Naduvattam, Pykara and Malkoondah covered the officially fixed total of about 1,200 acres (490 ha). Government and privately grown bark was being consigned to London, and the initial sales encouraged further private planting.

In Bengal, Anderson first tried growing cinchona on the Sinchal ridge near Darjeeling. Cold temperatures forced a move to Lebong, and in June 1864 the main experiment shifted to Rungbee. Rungbee and the adjacent settlement of Mungpoo later became effectively interchangeable names in official accounts. The site developed into the center of the Bengal government plantations. By 1875, more than three million trees were reportedly growing there, and the plantation was exchanging seeds and information with other colonial stations.

Officials distributed seedlings beyond the government estates and encouraged private trials. Cinchona was tested alongside tea, coffee and teak in Kangra, Assam, Darjeeling and Malabar, as well as in Ceylon and Burma. Most of these ventures remained smaller or shorter-lived than the main government systems. Their results nevertheless challenged the monopoly on goods imported from South America or Java.

== Cultivation and labor ==
=== Species and methods ===
The early plantations focused on red bark, C. succirubra, and crown bark, C. officinalis. Red bark was relatively hardy and propagated readily, but it contained relatively little quinine and larger proportions of other cinchona alkaloids that were lower in demand. C. calisaya and later C. ledgeriana could yield more quinine but were harder to establish. These differences became more important as pharmaceutical manufacturers increasingly demanded bark with a high and predictable quinine content. Samples from India were therefore sent to chemists including John Eliot Howard in London for assay.

By 1866, around 30 government and private plantations had been established in the Nilgiri Mountains. McIvor initially harvested alternate branches, but later promoted a method known as mossing: workers removed vertical strips of bark from a trunk and covered the exposed surface with moss to encourage new bark to form. Howard's assays suggested that this renewed bark could theoretically contain more alkaloids. Other specialists favored coppicing the trees or the traditional shaving method used in Java.

In Bengal, seeds were raised in nurseries before workers transplanted saplings onto terraced hillsides during the monsoon. Shade trees and legumes were planted among the cinchona to shelter young trees and reduce soil exhaustion. A common cycle involved coppicing mature trees for bark after about eight years and uprooting them for a final harvest at roughly sixteen years. Bark was stripped from the trees, dried in sheds and transported to the factory for grinding and chemical processing. Methods changed with species, location and the condition of the soil; repeated planting eventually was found to result in reduced yields and alkaloid content.

When Mungpoo's available land and older soils became inadequate, the Bengal government opened Munsong east of the Teesta River in 1901. Its warmer slopes favored yellow-bark varieties. By 1911 it held more than 1.5 million trees, predominantly C. calisaya and C. ledgeriana, and its bark was both richer in quinine and cheaper to produce than Mungpoo's. Munsong became the principal source of bark for the Mungpoo factory, although transport across the river and the shortage of a settled workforce resulted in difficulties in production.

=== Work and settlement ===
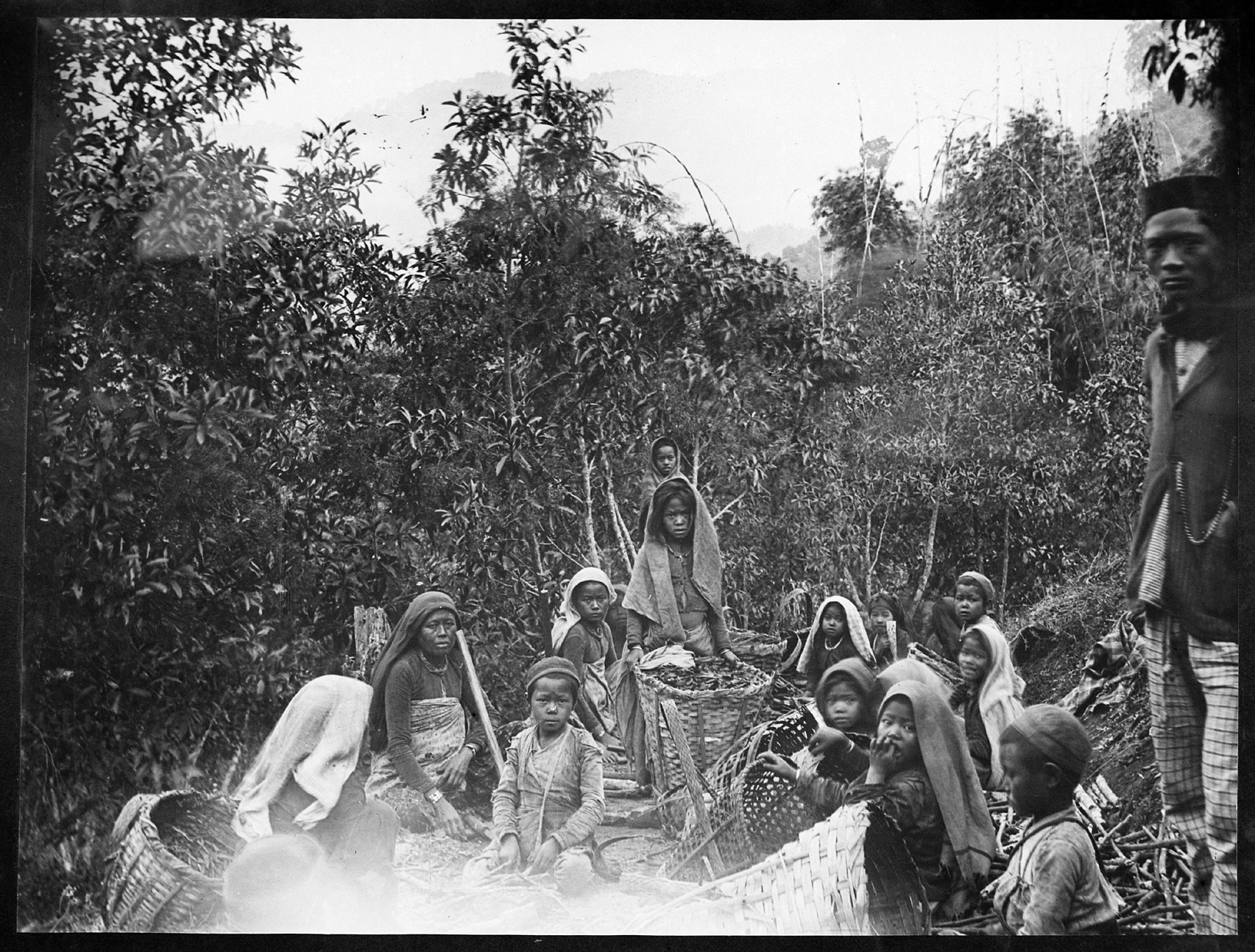
Workers collecting bark at Munsong plantation

In the Nilgiri Mountains, establishing the Dodabetta station involved clearing shola forest and displacing indigenous residents. The southern program also used Chinese convicts transferred from the Straits Settlements. During the famine of 1877, colonial observers described labor as plentiful and cheap, conditions that enabled private planting to expand despite the crop's long wait for a return on investment.

The plantations transformed mountain land as well as plant life. At Rungbee and Mungpoo, colonial descriptions of supposedly empty forest ignored existing Lepcha settlements and shifting cultivation. The government reserved large tracts for timber and possible cinchona expansion, restricting other claims to the land. The historian Rohan Deb Roy connected the program to the displacement of Lepcha cultivators and to the use of marginalized workers.

The Bengal estates recruited thousands of Nepali-speaking workers from Darjeeling and neighboring Himalayan regions. Many later identified as Gorkhas. The government offered wages, housing and plots for subsistence farming to attract families to remote plantations and stabilize a mobile workforce. Workers grew vegetables and kept livestock, while using nearby forests for fuel and building material. This combination of wage labor and household land differed from neighboring tea estates, where a larger amount of the available ground was planted with the commercial crop.

Work followed the traditional agricultural cycle. Crews cleared and terraced steep slopes, tended nurseries, transplanted saplings, coppiced and uprooted mature trees, and carried bark to drying sheds. Women and children often stripped the bark, while other workers operated the factory's boilers and chemical facilities. A hierarchy of European officers as well as Indian managers, overseers and workers organized the estates. Under the badli kam (substitute labor) system, one member of a resident household supplied labor to the plantation; the position could pass to another family member when a worker retired or died. The arrangement gave households continuing access to employment and a homestead, but also tied those benefits to continued plantation service and left workers without secure title to the land.

== Manufacture of cinchona drugs ==
Government manufacturing plants were established near the Nilgiri and Bengal plantations by the late 1860s. Because the abundant red bark contained several medically active alkaloids but relatively little quinine, officials at these plants studied whether mixtures of those alkaloids could provide a cheaper febrifuge than quinine. In 1866 chemists were appointed in the Nilgiri Mountains to develop such a product, commonly called quinetum or cinchona febrifuge. The Bengal factories tried to create a similar drug and began factory production at Mungpoo in the 1870s.

The quality of the Indian products was contested. John Eliot Howard and other European experts assessed samples for the British government while their own firms provided quinine to drugstores in India. Deb Roy notes that this made them act as both commercial competitors and judges of the colonial factories. For much of the 1860s and 1870s, preparations from the government works were not considered to be pure quinine. The Madras factory's "amorphous quinine" proved costly and difficult to sell; local manufacture was discontinued in the early 1870s, and from the middle of that decade most of the government bark crop was auctioned in London to be processed there instead.

At Mungpoo, government quinologist Charles H. Wood devised a relatively simple process for producing a mixed-alkaloid febrifuge with bamboo channels and locally available materials. The factory opened in 1875, and a government committee in 1877 found the new drug to be comparable to quinine sulfate as a treatment, though it could cause certain side effects like nausea.

Pharmaceutical preference nevertheless shifted toward standardized traditional quinine sulfate and barks rich in that single alkaloid. Mungpoo acquired imported machinery, experimented with yellow-bark species and ended up reducing the production of mixed febrifuge. In March 1888, plantation manager James Alexander Gammie applied to patent a process for producing cheap, pure quinine, with the support of the botanist George King. The Bengal government stated that the application was intended to prevent a private monopoly rather than reserve the process for itself. In 1889 it claimed that the Mungpoo factory could produce the cheapest pure quinine, which was disputed by officials and chemists.

== Distribution ==
The Bengal government introduced the pice-packet system in the early 1890s to carry Mungpoo quinine beyond hospitals and district headquarters. Each packet contained five grains and sold for one pice, one of the smallest coins in everyday circulation. Juvenile inmates at the Hazaribagh Reformatory School and convict workers at a Calcutta jail prepared the envelopes and filled them. Post offices maintained stocks, and postmasters and postal runners sold packets in villages. Police outposts, dispensaries, railway staff, estate managers and other vendors also participated.

The system spread to almost every province of British India by the late 1890s. Instructions on price and dose were printed on wrappers in several South Asian languages, while local administrations adapted the choice of vendors to their own circumstances. According to the government, postmen attracted less fear than police or revenue officers and could make quinine part of ordinary village transactions. Madras developed a parallel retail network. Packets of quinine sulfate were issued to district collectors from 1890, and in August 1893 postal officials were approved as sales agents. Postal distribution in the presidency continued into the 1930s.

Government manufacturing and distribution expanded substantially without satisfying demand. Nandini Bhattacharya records that government medical stores produced more than seven million quinine tablets and pills in 1909–1910, compared with fewer than two million in the preceding year.

== Competition ==
The British and Dutch programs began with similar problems of transfer and acclimatization but ended up developing different priorities. In Dutch Java, government scientists combined botanical selection with chemical testing to breed C. ledgeriana strains rich in quinine. They worked closely with private planters and pharmaceutical manufacturers, whose quality standards prioritized bark with a high proportion of a single alkaloid. In India, the government's main objective was simply a cheap supply of febrifuge alkaloids. Laboratory work concentrated on extraction and manufacture rather than going all-in on crop improvement. The researchers Arjo Roersch van der Hoogte and Toine Pieters argue that this separation left India without the autonomous crop-innovation system that formed around the Javanese industry.

Private cultivation in India and Ceylon proved vulnerable to sharp changes in bark prices. Planters often chose fast-growing red bark and abandoned cinchona when returns fell or other crops became more profitable. In India, the reported number of trees on government plantations declined from 17 1/4 million to 9 3/4 million during the ten years ending in 1894–1895. Java's high-yielding bark and large output depressed world prices; in the first decade of the twentieth century, it was reported to supply more than 90 percent of the world's cinchona plants. No Indian factory appeared in a 1905 list of the fifteen leading quinine manufacturers.

India's importance consequently lay more in consumption than production. In 1912 it accounted for an estimated one-sixth of world quinine use, but Indian factories supplied only about 12 percent of that consumption. Commercial firms could at times sell quinine more cheaply than government works, prompting proposals to close the plantations. Officials defended them as insurance against a Javanese monopoly or a future shortage, even if maintaining them ended up in an immediate loss.

=== Wartime expansion and shortage ===
Disrupted trade during the World War I reduced Indian reserves, and the government had to buy expensive bark from the Dutch-controlled market. In 1917, officials estimated that the colonial plantations and factories met only about one-third of Indian demand; they calculated that full supply would require more than 50,000 acres (20,000 ha) under cultivation, compared with the roughly 4,000 acres (1,600 ha) they had planted. Attempts to establish new plantations in Burma failed, but the Bengal system continued to expand. Rongo opened in 1938 and Latpanchar in 1943.

World War II produced a more severe crisis when the German occupation of the Netherlands cut off Dutch quinine supplies in Europe and the Japanese seizure of Java severed Allied access to Javanese bark. Indian factories gave military orders priority, while the government rationed and controlled prices in the civilian market. The emergency increased production at Mungpoo but also accelerated the research and use of synthetic alternatives such as quinacrine and chloroquine. Together with the insecticide DDT, these substances changed malaria policy after the war and reduced quinine's importance in combatting the disease.

== After independence ==
West Bengal inherited the Darjeeling and Kalimpong plantations, their workers and the Mungpoo factory in 1947, following India's independence from the United Kingdom. The state attempted to use nationalism to market quinine as an Indian public medicine, but falling world prices and the national malaria program's reliance on chloroquine and DDT weakened the industry. No new acreage was planted with cinchona between 1955 and 1965, and the government reduced labor and experimented with other crops, including ipecac and rubber. A temporary rise in bark prices during the late 1960s did not reverse the continuing decline in pharmaceutical demand.

The eastern plantations nevertheless survived as public-sector settlements after quinine manufacture slowly reduced in value. Workers and unions resisted closure and privatization because employment and housing remained tied to the historical plantation system. According to the historian Townsend Middleton, approximately 50,000 people were living across the former quinine estates in the early twenty-first century, amid underused fields and closed or deteriorating factory infrastructure. Despite this decline, cinchona cultivation has continued around Mungpoo under the Government of West Bengal, with the plantations primarily focusing on other medicinal crops

== See also ==
- Cinchona Missions
- History of malaria

== Bibliography ==
- Bhattacharya, Nandini (2023). Disparate Remedies: Making Medicines in Modern India. Montreal: McGill-Queen's University Press. ISBN 978-0-2280-1860-5.
- Deb Roy, Rohan (2017). Malarial Subjects: Empire, Medicine and Nonhumans in British India, 1820–1909. Science in History. Cambridge University Press. doi:10.1017/9781316771617. ISBN 978-1-316-77161-7.
- Middleton, Townsend (2024). Quinine's Remains: Empire's Medicine and the Life Thereafter (PDF). Oakland: University of California Press. doi:10.1525/luminos.187. ISBN 978-0-520-39913-6. Archived (PDF) from the original on August 15, 2024.
- Muraleedharan, V. R. (2000). "Quinine (Cinchona) and the Incurable Malaria: India c. 1900–1930s". Parassitologia. 42 (1–2): 91–100. PMID 11234337. Archived from the original on February 4, 2025.
- Roersch van der Hoogte, Arjo; Pieters, Toine (2014). "Science in the Service of Colonial Agro-Industrialism: The Case of Cinchona Cultivation in the Dutch and British East Indies, 1852–1900". Studies in History and Philosophy of Biological and Biomedical Sciences. 47: 12–22. doi:10.1016/j.shpsc.2014.05.019. PMID 24981994. Archived from the original on January 31, 2026.
- Veale, Lucy. "Exploring the Historical Geography of the Nilgiri Cinchona Plantations". Commodities of Empire. University of York. Archived from the original on December 6, 2025.
