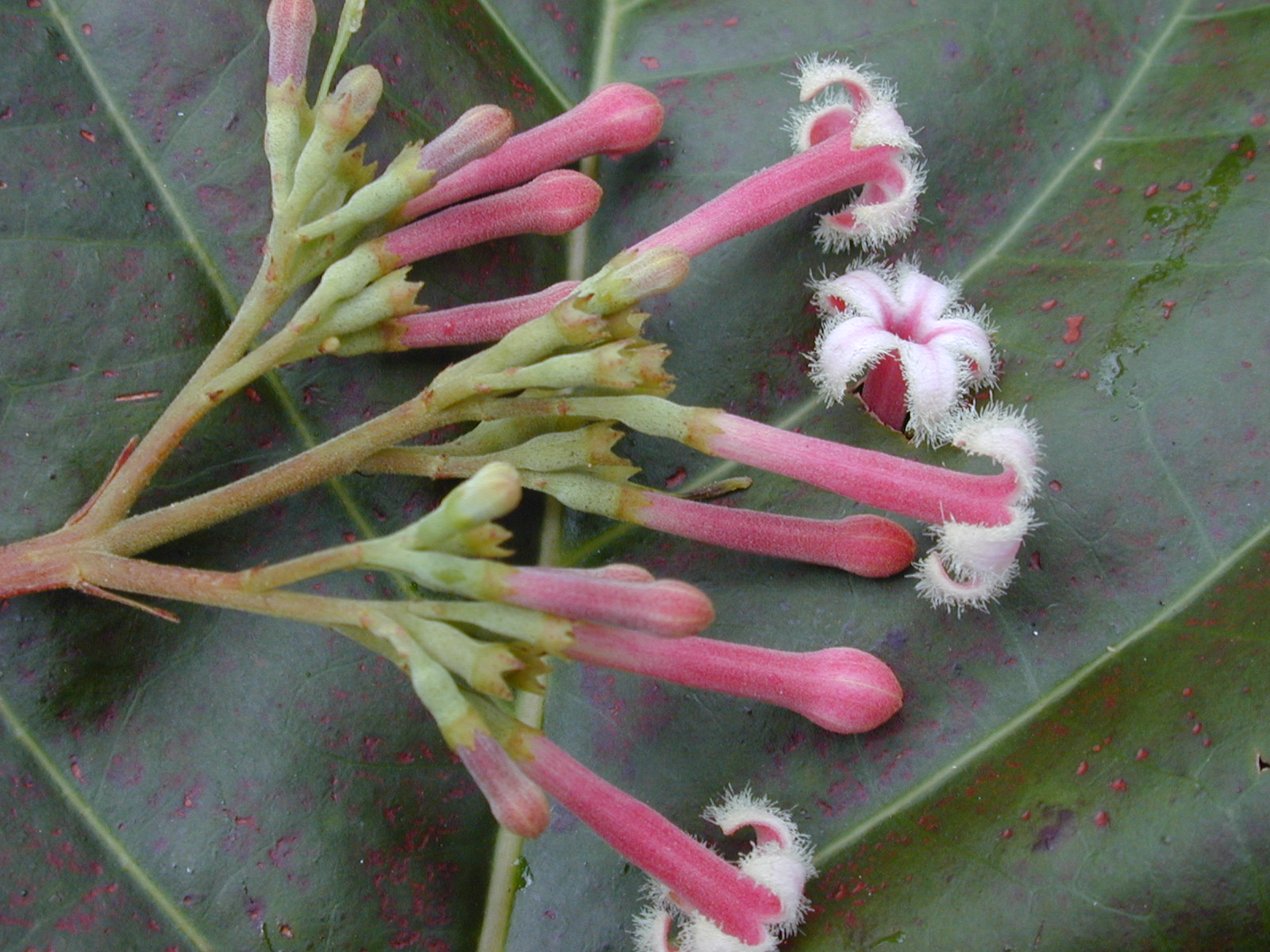
- C. pubescens

Scientific classification
- Kingdom: Plantae
- Clade: Tracheophytes
- Clade: Angiosperms
- Clade: Eudicots
- Clade: Asterids
- Order: Gentianales
- Family: Rubiaceae
- Subfamily: Cinchonoideae
- Tribe: Cinchoneae
- Genus: Cinchona; L.

Type species
- Cinchona officinalis L.

Species
- around 38 species; see § Species

= Cinchona =

Genus of plants, source of quinine

Cinchona (pronounced /sɪŋˈkoʊnə/ or /sɪnˈtʃoʊnə/) is a genus of flowering plants in the family Rubiaceae containing at least 23 species of trees and shrubs. All are native to the tropical Andean forests of western South America. A few species are reportedly naturalized in Central America, Jamaica, French Polynesia, Sulawesi, Saint Helena in the South Atlantic, and São Tomé and Príncipe off the coast of tropical Africa, and others have been cultivated in India and Java, where they have formed hybrids.

Cinchona has been historically sought after for its medicinal value, as the bark of several species yields quinine and other alkaloids. Trees in the genus are also known as fever trees because of their antimalarial properties. These were the only effective treatments against malaria during the height of European colonialism, which made them of great economic and political importance. Mass production of quinine from cinchona funneled wealth to Europe and enforced colonial power dynamics in South America.

The artificial synthesis of quinine in 1944, an increase in resistant forms of malaria, and the emergence of alternate therapies eventually ended large-scale economic interest in Cinchona cultivation. Cinchona alkaloids show promise in treating Plasmodium falciparum malaria, which has evolved resistance to synthetic drugs, reinforcing the plant's medicinal significance 400 years after Europeans' first documentation of its quinine. Cinchona plants continue to be revered for their historical legacy; the national tree of Peru is in the genus Cinchona.

== Etymology and common names ==
Carl Linnaeus named the genus in 1742, based on a story from 104 years earlier.

The claim is that the plant cured a case of malaria suffered by the Countess of Chinchón, the vicereine of Peru in 1638. She then ordered the commercial harvesting of the bark and organized its successful distribution in Europe starting in the late 1600s.

Linnaeus used the Italian spelling Cinchona, but the name Chinchón (pronounced [tʃinˈtʃon] in Spanish) led to Clements Markham and many others proposing a correction of the spelling to Chinchona, and some prefer the pronunciation /tʃɪnˈtʃoʊnə/ for the common name of the plant.

Traditional medicine uses from South America known as Jesuit's bark and Jesuit's powder have been traced to Cinchona. In Nigeria it is locally called dogo yaro, or Dogo'n yaro, which translates to 'tall man'.

== Description ==
Cinchona plants belong to the family Rubiaceae and are large shrubs or small trees with evergreen foliage, growing 5 to 15 m (16 to 49 ft) in height. The leaves are opposite, rounded to lanceolate, and 10–40 cm long. The flowers are white, pink, or red, and produced in terminal panicles. The fruit is a small capsule containing numerous seeds. A key character of the genus is that the flowers have marginally hairy corolla lobes. Some species display heterostyly. The tribe Cinchoneae includes the genera Cinchonopsis, Jossia, Ladenbergia, Remijia, Stilpnophyllum, and Ciliosemina. In South America, natural populations of Cinchona species have geographically distinct distributions. During the 19th century, the introduction of several species into cultivation in the same areas of India and Java, by the English and Dutch East India Company, respectively, led to the formation of hybrids.

Linnaeus described the genus based on the species Cinchona officinalis, which is found only in a small region of Ecuador and is of little medicinal significance. Nearly 300 species were later described and named in the genus, but a revision of the genus in 1998 identified only 23 distinct species.

== History ==
=== Early references ===
The febrifugal properties of bark from trees now known to be in the genus Cinchona were used by many South American cultures prior to European contact. However, they had no knowledge of its specific antimalarial or antiparasicic properties because they had no knowledge of malaria itself, which was an Old World disease prior to the Columbian Exchange. Jesuits played a key role in the transfer of remedies from the New World.

The traditional story connecting Cinchona species with malaria treatment was first recorded by Italian physician Sebastiano Bado in 1663. It tells of the wife of Luis Jerónimo de Cabrera, 4th Count of Chinchón and Viceroy of Peru, who fell ill in Lima with a tertian fever. A Spanish governor advised a traditional remedy, which resulted in a miraculous and rapid cure. The countess then supposedly ordered a large quantity of the bark and took it back to Europe. Bado claimed to have received this information from an Italian named Antonius Bollus, who was a merchant in Peru. Clements Markham identified the countess as Ana de Osorio, but this was shown to be incorrect by Haggis. Ana de Osorio married the Count of Chinchón in August 1621 and died in 1625, several years before the count was appointed viceroy of Peru in 1628. His second wife, Francisca Henriques de Ribera, accompanied him to Peru. Haggis further examined the count's diaries and found no mention of the countess suffering from fever, although the count himself had many malarial attacks. Because of these and numerous other discrepancies, Bado's story has been generally rejected as little more than a legend.

Quina bark was mentioned by Fray Antonio de La Calancha in 1638 as coming from a tree in Loja (Loxa). He noted that bark powder weighing about two coins was cast into water and drunk to cure fevers and "tertians". Jesuit Father Bernabé Cobo (1582–1657) also wrote on the "fever tree" in 1653. The legend was popularized in English literature by Markham, and in 1874, he also published a "plea for the correct spelling of the genus Chinchona". Spanish physician and botanist Nicolás Monardes wrote of a New World bark powder used in Spain in 1574, and another physician, Juan Fragoso, wrote of bark powder from an unknown tree in 1600 that was used for treating various ills. Both identify the sources as trees that do not bear fruit and have heart-shaped leaves; they were suggested to have been referring to Cinchona species.

The name quina-quina or quinquina was suggested as an old name for Cinchona used in Europe and based on the native name used by the Quechua people which means 'bark of barks'. Italian sources spelt quina as "cina", which was a source of confusion with Smilax from China. Haggis argued that qina and Jesuit's bark actually referred to Myroxylon peruiferum, or Peruvian balsam, and that this was an item of importance in Spanish trade in the 1500s. Over time, the bark of Myroxylon may have been adulterated with the similar-looking bark of what is now known as Cinchona. Gradually, the adulterant became the main product that was the key therapeutic ingredient used in malarial therapy. The bark was included as Cortex Peruanus in the London Pharmacopoeia in 1677.

=== Economic significance ===
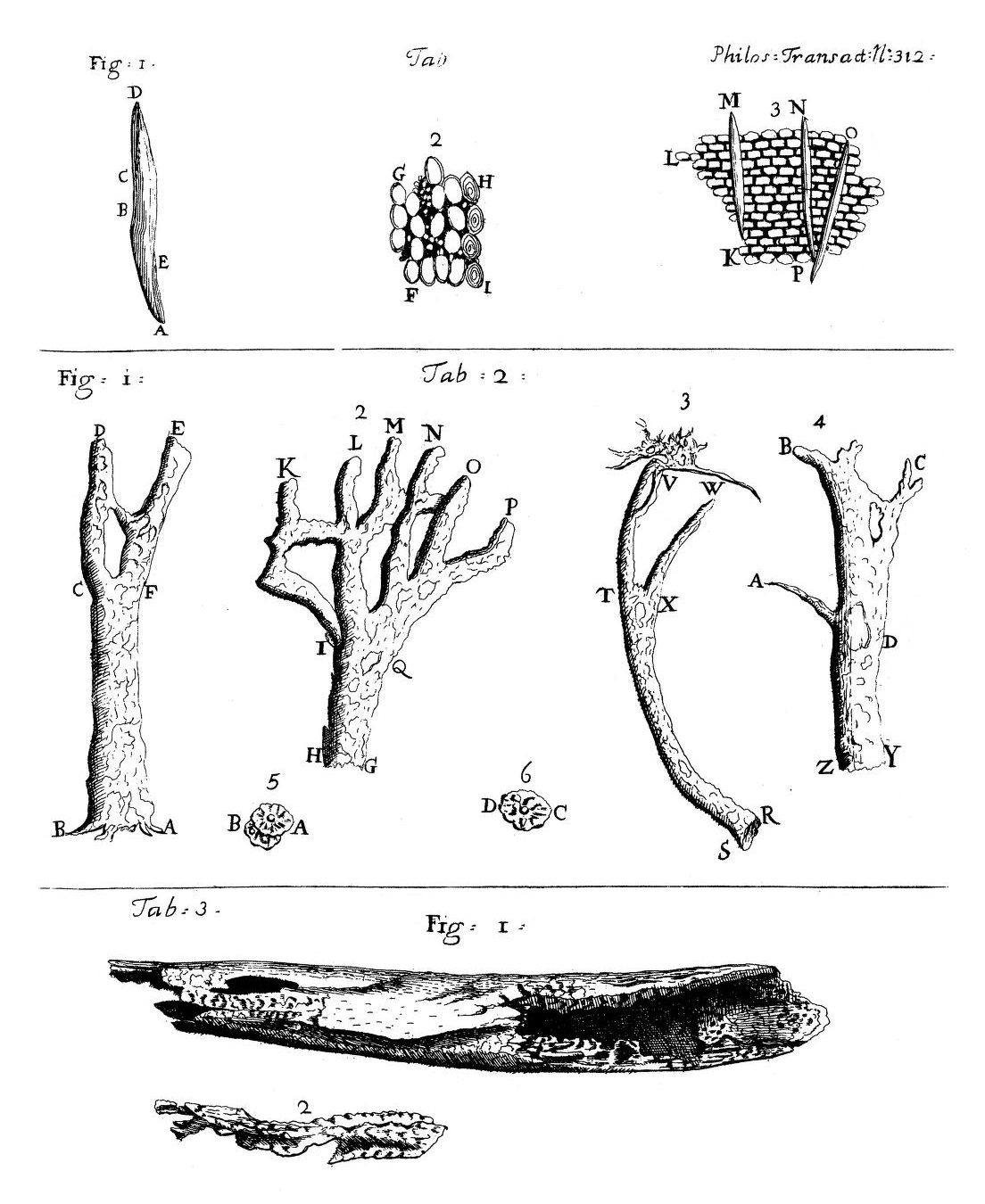
Cortex peruvianus study by Antonie van Leeuwenhoek, 1706

The "fever tree" was finally described carefully by astronomer Charles Marie de la Condamine, who visited Quito in 1735 on a quest to measure an arc of the meridian. The species he described, Cinchona officinalis, however, was found to be of little therapeutic value. The first living plants seen in Europe were C. calisaya plants grown at the Jardin des Plantes from seeds collected by Hugh Algernon Weddell from Bolivia in 1846. José Celestino Mutis, physician to the Viceroy of Nueva Granada, Pedro Messia de la Cerda, gathered information on cinchona in Colombia from 1760 and wrote a manuscript, El Arcano de la Quina (1793), with illustrations. He proposed a Spanish expedition to search for plants of commercial value, which was approved in 1783 and was continued after his death in 1808 by his nephew Sinforoso Mutis. As demand for the bark increased, the trees in the forests began to be destroyed. To maintain their monopoly on cinchona bark, Peru and surrounding countries began outlawing the export of cinchona seeds and saplings beginning in the early 19th century.

The colonial European powers eventually considered growing the plant in other parts of the tropics. The French mission of 1743, of which de la Condamine was a member, lost their cinchona plants when a wave took them off their ship. The Dutch sent Justus Hasskarl, who brought plants that were then cultivated in Java from 1854. English explorer Clements Markham went to collect plants that were introduced in Sri Lanka and the Nilgiris of southern India in 1860. The main species introduced were C. succirubra, or red bark, (now C. pubescens) as its sap turned red on contact with air, and Cinchona calisaya. The alkaloids quinine and cinchonine were extracted by Pierre Joseph Pelletier and Joseph Bienaimé Caventou in 1820. Two more key alkaloids, quinidine and cinchonidine, were later identified and it became a routine in quinology to examine the contents of these components in assays. The yields of quinine in the cultivated trees were low and time was needed to develop sustainable methods to extract bark.

In the meantime, Charles Ledger and his native assistant Manuel Incra Mamani collected another species from Bolivia. Mamani was caught and beaten by Bolivian officials, leading to his death, but Ledger obtained seeds containing high levels of quinine. These seeds were offered to the British, who were uninterested, leading to the rest being sold to the Dutch. The Dutch saw their value and multiplied the stock. The species later named Cinchona ledgeriana yielded 8 to 13% quinine in bark grown in Dutch Indonesia, which effectively outcompeted the British Indian production which focused on a range of alkaloids other than quinine. Only later did the English see the value and sought to obtain the seeds of C. ledgeriana from the Dutch. In the 19th century, the British had established cinchona plantations in India from seeds they smuggled out of Ecuador, Peru, and Bolivia, which were mass manufactured into pills and tablets used by imperial soldiers.

Francesco Torti used the response of fevers to treatment with Cinchona as a system of classification of fevers or a means for diagnosis between malarial and non-malarial fevers. Its use in the effective treatment of malaria brought an end to treatment by bloodletting and long-held ideas of humorism from Galen. Clements Markham was knighted for his role in establishing Cinchona species in Indonesia. Hasskarl was knighted with the Dutch order of the Lion.

== Impacts on indigenous communities ==
Although cinchona's fever-reducing properties were know to the indigenous people of South America, it was Europeans who discovered its antimalarial properties. Native South Americans also made no effort to spread their knowledge to the rest of the world. A CDC paper published in July 2026 says that millions of lives, including the indigenous people of Africa, India, and other malaria-prone areas, were saved by this discovery and by European production of cinchona around the world on an industrial scale. European extraction of Quinine from the bark also led to the European discovery of synthetic antimalarial drugs such as chloroquine and hydroxychloroquine, which saved "hundreds of millions" more lives.

== Ecology ==
Cinchona species are used as food plants by the larvae of some lepidopteran species, including the engrailed, the commander, and members of the genus Endoclita, including E. damor, E. purpurescens, and E. sericeus.

C. pubescens has grown uncontrolled on some islands, such as the Galapagos, where it has posed the risk of outcompeting native plant species.

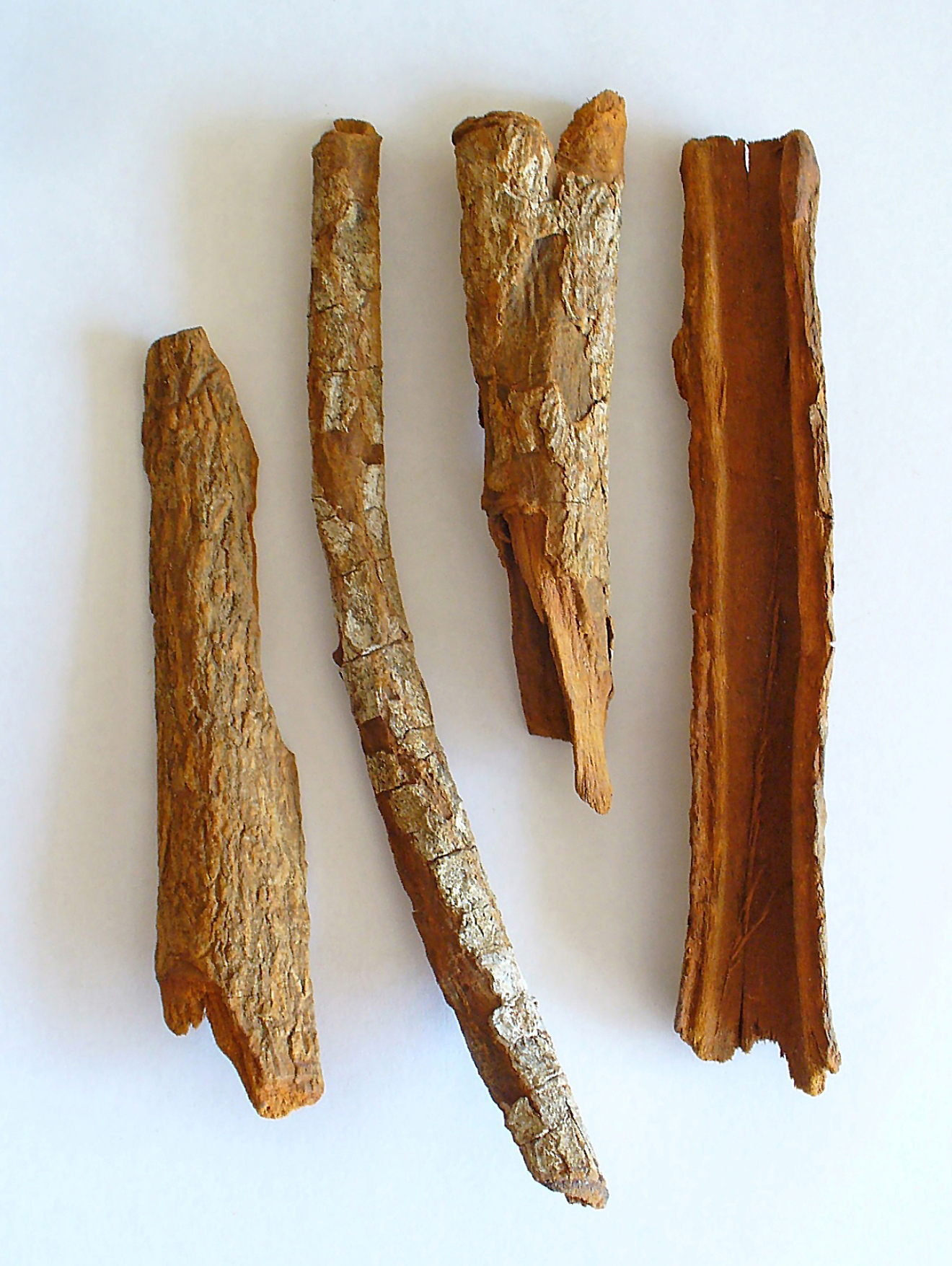
Cinchona officinalis, the harvested bark

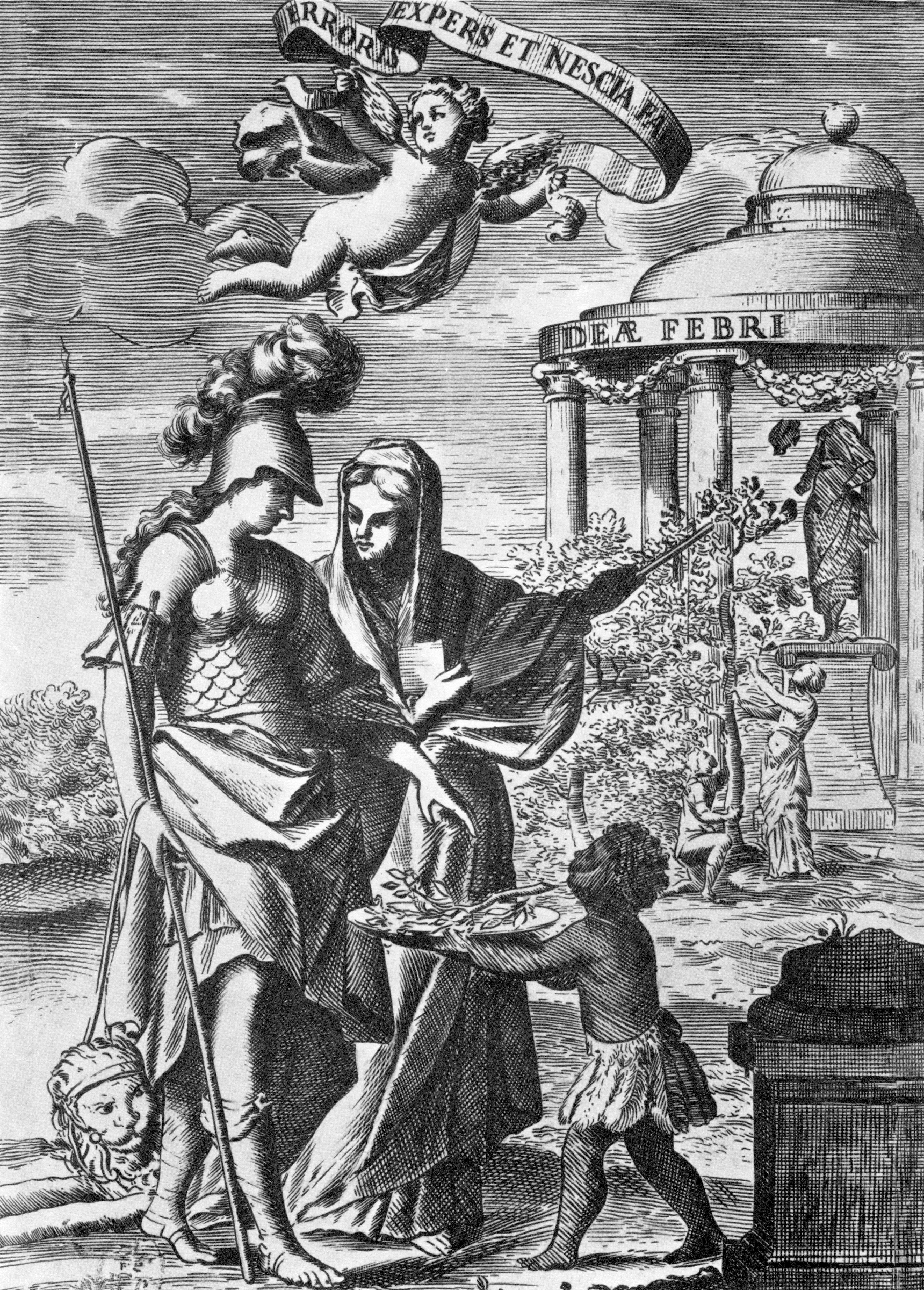
Peru offers a branch of cinchona to science (from a 17th-century engraving).

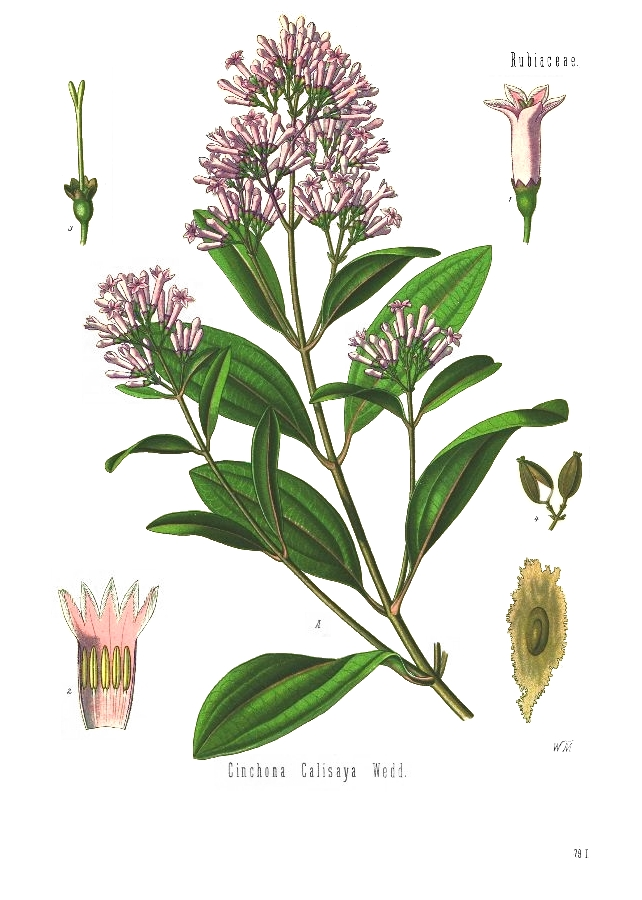
A 19th-century illustration of Cinchona calisaya

== Cultivation and use ==
Whether cinchona bark was used in any traditional medicines within Andean Indigenous groups when it first came to notice by Europeans is unclear. Since its first confirmed medicinal record in the early 17th century, it has been used as a treatment for malaria. This use was popularized in Europe by the Spanish colonizers of South America. The bark contains alkaloids, including quinine and quinidine. Cinchona is the only economically practical source of quinine, a drug that is still recommended for the treatment of falciparum malaria.

=== Europe ===
Italian botanist Pietro Castelli wrote a pamphlet noteworthy as being the first Italian publication to mention the Cinchona species. By the 1630s (or 1640s, depending on the reference), the bark was being exported to Europe. In the late 1640s, the method of use of the bark was noted in the Schedula Romana. The Royal Society of London published in its first year (1666) "An account of Dr. Sydenham's book, entitled, Methodus curandi febres . . ."

English King Charles II called upon Robert Talbor, who had become famous for his miraculous malaria cure. Because at that time the bark was in religious controversy, Talbor gave the king the bitter bark decoction in great secrecy. The treatment gave the king complete relief from the malaria fever. In return, Talbor was offered membership of the prestigious Royal College of Physicians.

In 1679, Talbor was called by the King of France, Louis XIV, whose son was suffering from malarial fever. After a successful treatment, Talbor was rewarded by the king with 3,000 gold crowns and a lifetime pension for this prescription. Talbor was asked to keep the entire episode secret. After Talbor's death, the French king published this formula: seven grams of rose leaves, two ounces of lemon juice and a strong decoction of the cinchona bark served with wine. Wine was used because some alkaloids of the cinchona bark are not soluble in water, but are soluble in the ethanol in wine. In 1681 Água de Inglaterra was introduced into Portugal from England by Dr. Fernando Mendes who, similarly, "received a handsome gift from (King Pedro) on condition that he should reveal to him the secret of its composition and withhold it from the public".

In 1738, Sur l'arbre du quinquina, a paper written by Charles Marie de La Condamine, lead member of the expedition, along with Pierre Godin and Louis Bouger that was sent to Ecuador to determine the length of a degree of the 1/4 of meridian arc in the neighbourhood of the equator, was published by the French Academy of Sciences. In it he identified three separate species.

=== Homeopathy ===
The birth of homeopathy was based on cinchona bark testing. The founder of homeopathy, Samuel Hahnemann, when translating William Cullen's Materia medica, noticed Cullen had written that Peruvian bark was known to cure intermittent fevers. Hahnemann took daily a large, rather than homeopathic, dose of Peruvian bark. After two weeks, he said he felt malaria-like symptoms. This idea of "like cures like" was the starting point of his writings on homeopathy. Hahnemann's symptoms have been suggested by researchers, both homeopaths and skeptics, as being an indicator of his hypersensitivity to quinine.

=== Widespread cultivation ===
The bark was very valuable to Europeans in expanding their access to and exploitation of resources in distant colonies and at home. Bark gathering was often environmentally destructive, destroying huge expanses of trees for their bark, with difficult conditions for low wages that did not allow the indigenous bark gatherers to settle debts even upon death.

Further exploration of the Amazon Basin and the economy of trade in various species of the bark in the 18th century is captured by Lardner Gibbon:

... this bark was first gathered in quantities in 1849, though known for many years. The best quality is not quite equal to that of Yungas, but only second to it. There are four other classes of inferior bark, for some of which the bank pays fifteen dollars per quintal. The best, by law, is worth fifty-four dollars. The freight to Arica is seventeen dollars the mule load of three quintals. Six thousand quintals of bark have already been gathered from Yuracares. The bank was established in the year 1851. Mr. [Thaddäus] Haenke mentioned the existence of cinchona bark on his visit to Yuracares in 1796

— Exploration of the Valley of the Amazon, by Lieut. Lardner Gibbon, USN. Vol. II, Ch. 6, pp. 146–47.

It was estimated that the British Empire incurred direct losses of 52 to 62 million pounds a year due to malaria sickness each year. It was therefore of great importance to secure the supply of the cure. In 1860, a British expedition to South America led by Clements Markham smuggled back cinchona seeds and plants, which were introduced in several areas of British India and Sri Lanka. In India, it was planted in Ootacamund by William Graham McIvor. In Sri Lanka, it was planted in the Hakgala Botanical Garden in January 1861. James Taylor, the pioneer of tea planting in Sri Lanka, was one of the pioneers of cinchona cultivation. By 1883, about 64,000 acres (260 km^{2}) were in cultivation in Sri Lanka, with exports reaching a peak of 15 million pounds in 1886. The cultivation (initially of C. succirubra (now C. pubescens) and later of C. calisaya) was extended through the work of George King and others into the hilly terrain of Darjeeling District of Bengal. Cinchona factories were established at Naduvattam in the Nilgiris and at Mungpoo, Darjeeling, West Bengal. Quinologists were appointed to oversee the extraction of alkaloids with John Broughton in the Nilgiris and C.H. Wood at Darjeeling. Others in the position included David Hooper and John Eliot Howard.

As Western nations gained control over cinchona from plantations beyond South America, countries the medicinal plant was native to, including Ecuador, Peru, and Bolivia, lost their monopoly. The overseas cinchona market produced vast wealth for European countries, and enforced trade dynamics of imperial nations having power over the Global South, even once colonies were independent nations.

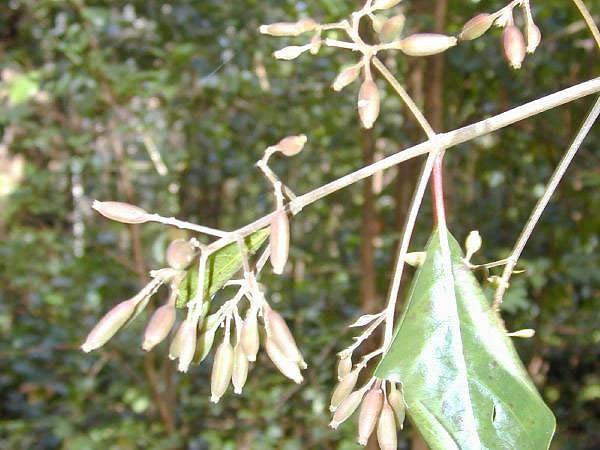
C. pubescens fruit

In 1865, "New Virginia" and "Carlota Colony" were established in Mexico by Matthew Fontaine Maury, a former Confederate in the American Civil War. Postwar Confederates were enticed there by Maury, now the "Imperial Commissioner of Immigration" for Emperor Maximillian of Mexico, and Archduke of Habsburg. All that survives of those two colonies are the flourishing groves of cinchonas established by Maury using seeds purchased from England. These seeds were the first to be introduced into Mexico.

The cultivation of cinchona led from the 1890s to a decline in the price of quinine, but the quality and production of raw bark by the Dutch in Indonesia led them to dominate world markets. The producers of processed drugs in Europe (especially Germany), however, bargained and caused fluctuations in prices, which led to a Dutch-led Cinchona Agreement in 1913 that ensured a fixed price for producers. A Kina Bureau in Amsterdam regulated this trade.

During World War II, the Japanese conquered Java and the United States lost access to the cinchona plantations that supplied war-critical quinine medication. Botanical expeditions called Cinchona Missions were launched between 1942 and 1944 to explore promising areas of South America in an effort to locate cinchona species that contained quinine and could be harvested for quinine production. As well as being ultimately successful in their primary aim, these expeditions also identified new species of plants and created a new chapter in international relations between the United States and other nations in the Americas.

== Chemistry ==
=== Cinchona alkaloids ===
General structure of Cinchona alkaloids

The bark of trees in this genus is the source of a variety of alkaloids, the most familiar of which is quinine, an antipyretic (antifever) agent especially useful in treating malaria. For a while the extraction of a mixture of alkaloids from the cinchona bark, known in India as the cinchona febrifuge, was used. The alkaloid mixture or its sulphated form mixed in alcohol and sold as quinetum was however very bitter and caused nausea, among other side effects.

Cinchona alkaloids include:

- cinchonine and cinchonidine (stereoisomers with R^{1} = vinyl, R^{2} = hydrogen)
- quinine and quinidine (stereoisomers with R^{1} = vinyl, R^{2} = methoxy)
- dihydroquinine and dihydroquinidine (stereoisomers with R^{1} = ethyl, R^{2} = methoxy)

They find use in organic chemistry as organocatalysts in asymmetric synthesis.

=== Other chemicals ===
Alongside the alkaloids, many cinchona barks contain cinchotannic acid, a particular tannin, which by oxidation rapidly yields a dark-coloured phlobaphene called red cinchonic, cinchono-fulvic acid, or cinchona red.

In 1934, efforts to make malaria drugs cheap and effective for use across countries led to the development of a standard called "totaquina" proposed by the Malaria Commission of the League of Nations. Totaquina required a minimum of 70% crystallizable alkaloids, of which at least 15% was to be quinine with not more than 20% amorphous alkaloids.

== Species ==
There are at least 24 species of Cinchona recognized by botanists. There are likely several unnamed species and many intermediate forms that have arisen due to the plants' tendency to hybridize.

- Cinchona anderssonii Maldonado
- Cinchona antioquiae L.Andersson
- Cinchona asperifolia Wedd.
- Cinchona barbacoensis H.Karst.
- Cinchona calisaya Wedd. (Note: The variety of Calisayan cinchona introduced to the Dutch East Indies was also sometimes distinguished as Cinchona pahudiana, named in honor of the Dutch colonial minister C.F. Pahud.)
- Cinchona capuli L.Andersson
- Cinchona fruticosa L.Andersson
- Cinchona glandulifera Ruiz & Pav.
- Cinchona hirsuta Ruiz & Pav.
- Cinchona krauseana L.Andersson
- Cinchona lancifolia Mutis
- Cinchona lucumifolia Pav. ex Lindl.
- Cinchona macrocalyx Pav. ex DC.
- Cinchona micrantha Ruiz & Pav.
- Cinchona mutisii Lamb.
- Cinchona nitida Ruiz & Pav.
- Cinchona officinalis L.
- Cinchona parabolica Pav. in J.E.Howard
- Cinchona pitayensis (Wedd.) Wedd.
- Cinchona pubescens Vahl
- Cinchona pyrifolia L.Andersson
- Cinchona rugosa Pav. in J.E.Howard
- Cinchona scrobiculata Humb. & Bonpl.
- Cinchona villosa Pav. ex Lindl.

== See also ==
- Cinchonism
- History of malaria
- Quillaja saponaria
- Bioprospecting
- Biopiracy
