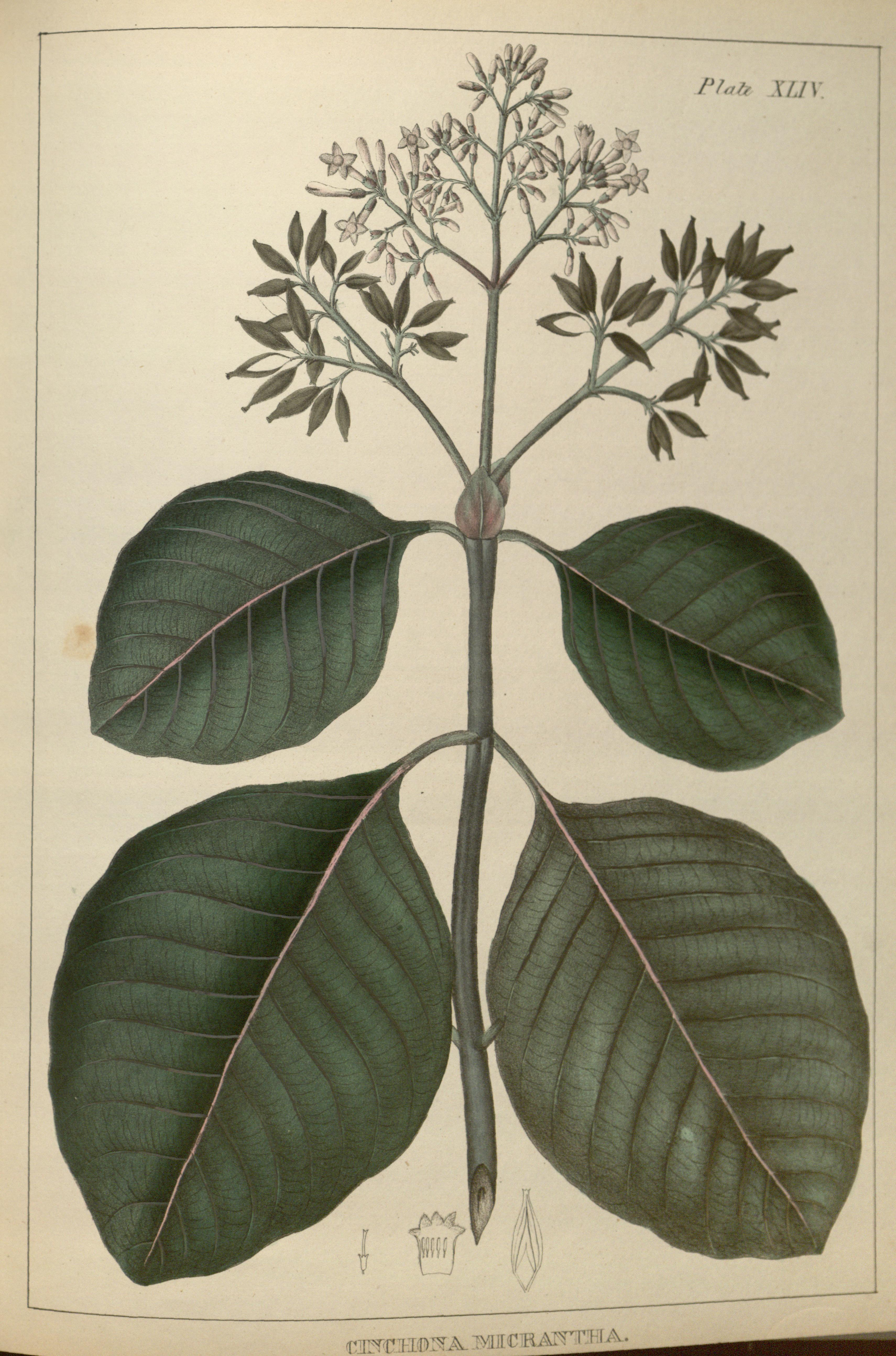

Conservation status
- Least Concern (IUCN 3.1)

Scientific classification
- Kingdom: Plantae
- Clade: Tracheophytes
- Clade: Angiosperms
- Clade: Eudicots
- Clade: Asterids
- Order: Gentianales
- Family: Rubiaceae
- Genus: Cinchona
- Species: C. micrantha

Binomial name
- Cinchona micrantha Ruiz & Pav.

Synonyms
- Synonymy: Cinchona peruviana var. micrantha (Ruiz & Pav.) Howard; Quinquina micrantha (Ruiz & Pav.) Kuntze; Cinchona micrantha var. affinis Pav.; Cinchona micrantha var. calisayoides Pav.; Cinchona micrantha var. huanucensis Pav.; Cinchona micrantha var. reicheliana Pav.; Cinchona micrantha var. rotundifolia Wedd.; Cinchona parviflora Poir.; Cinchona peruviana var. reicheliana Howard; Cinchona reicheliana Howard

= Cinchona micrantha =

Species of flowering plant

Cinchona micrantha is a species of flowering plant in the family Rubiaceae. It is a tree with thin leaves, white flowers, and capsule fruits. The species is native to Peru.

Cinchona micrantha was described in 1799, and is listed as of Least Concern by the IUCN.

== Taxonomy ==
The species was described by Hipólito Ruiz López and José Antonio Pavón Jiménez in 1799.

== Distribution ==
Cinchona micrantha is native to the wet tropical biome of eastern Peru. It grows at elevations of 500–3,000 metres (1,600–9,800 ft), on the eastern slopes of the Andes.

== Description ==
Cinchona micrantha is a tree that grows up to 12 metres (39 ft) tall, and 20 centimetres (7.9 in) wide at breast height.

The leaves are papery when dry, thin, ovate to obovate, 7.6–27 centimetres (3.0–10.6 in) long, and 5–17 centimetres (2.0–6.7 in) wide. The leaves have domatia between the veins. The leaf stems are 1.2–3.8 centimetres (0.47–1.50 in) long.

The calyx is 1.1–1.6 millimetres (0.043–0.063 in) long, with 0.3–0.7 millimetres (0.012–0.028 in) long lobes. The corolla is a white tube, measuring 5.1–7.3 millimetres (0.20–0.29 in) long, with 2.7–4.4 millimetres (0.11–0.17 in) lobes.

The fruit is a dehiscent, ovoid to subcylindrical capsule, measuring 8–30 millimetres (0.31–1.18 in) long, and 4–7 millimetres (0.16–0.28 in) wide. The endocarp is papery. The seeds are 6.4–9.3 millimetres (0.25–0.37 in) long, and 1.3–2.8 millimetres (0.051–0.110 in) wide.

Cinchona micrantha is similar to Cinchona pubescens, and may hybridise with it. Cinchona micrantha may also be confused with hybrids between Cinchona pubescens and Cinchona calisaya.

== Conservation ==
In 2022, the IUCN assessed Cinchona micrantha as of Least Concern.

== Nomenclature ==
In Spanish, the species is known as Quina de Huánuco, Quina Canela, Quepo Cascarilla, Motosolo, Monopol, Lechuga Calisaya, Cascarilla Verde, Cascarilla Provinciana Negrilla, Cascarilla Provinciana Blanquita, Cascarilla Provinciana Blanquilla, Cascarilla Provinciana, Cascarilla Negra, Cascarilla Motosolo, Cascarilla Huanuco, Cascarilla Fina, Cascarilla Boba de Hojas Moradas, Cascarilla Amarilla, Cascarilla, or Calisaya.
