= Cinchona rugosa =

Conservation status
- Endangered (IUCN 3.1)

Scientific classification
- Kingdom: Plantae
- Clade: Tracheophytes
- Clade: Angiosperms
- Clade: Eudicots
- Clade: Asterids
- Order: Gentianales
- Family: Rubiaceae
- Genus: Cinchona
- Species: C. rugosa

Binomial name
- Cinchona rugosa Pav.

Species of flowering plant

Cinchona rugosa is a species of flowering plant in the family Rubiaceae. It is a tree with wrinkled and papery leaves, reddish flowers, and capsule fruits. The species is native to Ecuador.

Cinchona rugosa was described in 1859, and is listed as Endangered by the IUCN.

== Taxonomy ==
Cinchona rugosa was described by José Antonio Pavón Jiménez in 1859. It can hybridise with Cinchona macrocalyx.

== Distribution ==
Cinchona rugosa is native to the wet tropical biome of south-east Ecuador. It grows at elevations of 2,500–3,500 metres (8,200–11,500 ft).

== Description ==
Cinchona rugosa is a tree. It grows up to 16 metres (52 ft) tall. The young branches have reddish or brownish hairs.

The leaves are elliptical, ovate, or suborbicular, wrinkled, firmly papery when dry, 5–6.5 centimetres (2.0–2.6 in) long, and 3.8–5.8 centimetres (1.5–2.3 in) wide. The leaf stems are 0.7–1 centimetre (0.28–0.39 in) long.

The calyx is 4.6–6.9 millimetres (0.18–0.27 in) long, and has 1.6–2.9 millimetres (0.063–0.114 in) long lobes. The corolla is reddish, and has a 11–13 millimetres (0.43–0.51 in) long tube, and 7–8 millimetres (0.28–0.31 in) long lobes.

The fruit is a dehiscent, more or less ellipsoid capsule measuring 10–24 millimetres (0.39–0.94 in) long, and 8–10 millimetres (0.31–0.39 in) wide. The endocarp is woody, and around 0.7 millimetres (0.028 in) thick. The seeds are 8–9 millimetres (0.31–0.35 in) long, and 3.1–3.5 millimetres (0.12–0.14 in) wide.

== Conservation ==
In 2024, the IUCN assessed Cinchona rugosa as Endangered.

== Nomenclature ==
In Spanish, the species is known as Crespilla.
