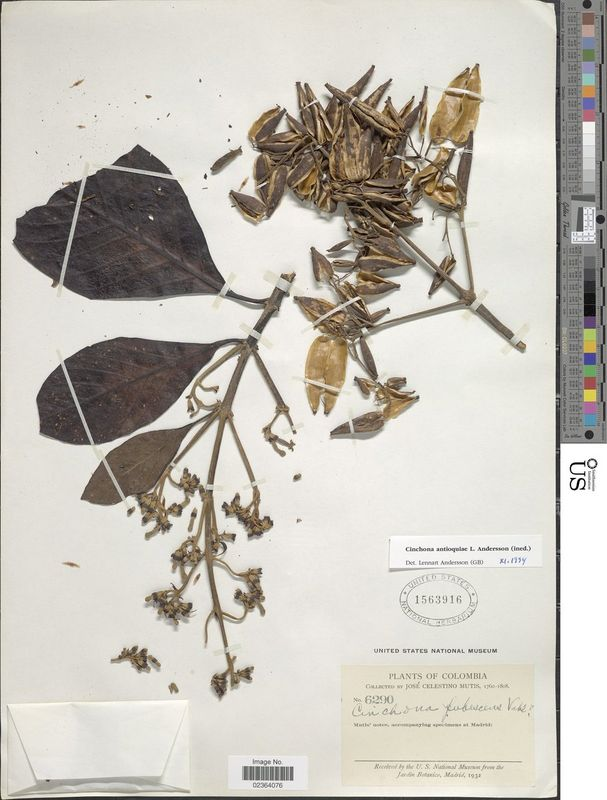

Conservation status
- Least Concern (IUCN 3.1)

Scientific classification
- Kingdom: Plantae
- Clade: Embryophytes
- Clade: Tracheophytes
- Clade: Angiosperms
- Clade: Eudicots
- Clade: Asterids
- Order: Gentianales
- Family: Rubiaceae
- Genus: Cinchona
- Species: C. antioquiae

Binomial name
- Cinchona antioquiae L.Andersson

= Cinchona antioquiae =

Species of flowering plant

Cinchona antioquiae is a species of flowering plant in the family Rubiaceae. It is a shrub or tree with papery leaves, pink or purple flowers, and capsule fruits. The species is native to Colombia.

Cinchona antioquiae was described in 1998, and is listed as of Least Concern by the IUCN.

== Taxonomy ==
The species was described by Bengt Lennart Andersson in 1998.

== Distribution ==
Cinchona antioquiae is native to the wet tropical biome of Colombia. The species grows in the Cordillera Central and Cordillera Occidental, at elevations of 1,600–1,800 metres (5,200–5,900 ft).

The species grows in forests on steep slopes, at the edges of forests, and solitary in pastures.

== Description ==
Cinchona antioquiae is a shrub or tree. It is one of the largest species in the genus Cinchona, growing up to 18 metres (59 ft) high, and around 15 centimetres (5.9 in) wide at breast height.

The leaf stems are 0.9–4 centimetres (0.35–1.57 in) long. The leaves are obovate, papery when dry, 8.5–23 centimetres (3.3–9.1 in) long, and 2.6–13 centimetres (1.0–5.1 in) wide.

The calyx is 1.7–3.7 millimetres (0.067–0.146 in) long, and has 0.4–1.3 millimetres (0.016–0.051 in) long lobes. The corolla is a pink or purple, 14–21 millimetres (0.55–0.83 in) long tube, which has 4.6–7.1 millimetres (0.18–0.28 in) long lobes. The flowers have been noted to be strongly fragrant.

The fruit is a dehiscent, ellipsoid to subcylindrical capsule, with a papery endocarp. The seeds are 10–14 millimetres (0.39–0.55 in) long, and 1.6–2.9 millimetres (0.063–0.114 in) wide.

Cinchona antioquiae is similar to, and sometimes misidentified as, Cinchona pubescens.

== Conservation ==
In 2019, the IUCN assessed Cinchona antioquiae as of Least Concern.

== Nomenclature ==
In Spanish, the species is known as Tabaquillo.
