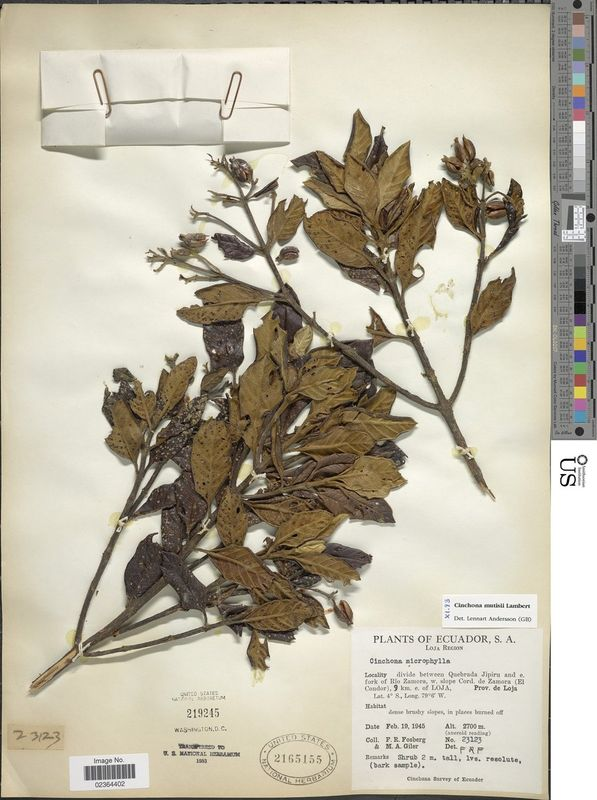

Conservation status
- Endangered (IUCN 3.1)

Scientific classification
- Kingdom: Plantae
- Clade: Tracheophytes
- Clade: Angiosperms
- Clade: Eudicots
- Clade: Asterids
- Order: Gentianales
- Family: Rubiaceae
- Genus: Cinchona
- Species: C. mutisii

Binomial name
- Cinchona mutisii Lamb.

Synonyms
- Cinchona microphylla Pav. ex Lamb.; Cinchona microphylla Pav.; Cinchona mutisii var. microphylla Wedd.; Cinchona quercifolia Pav. ex Lamb.

= Cinchona mutisii =

Species of flowering plant

Cinchona mutisii is a species of flowering plant in the family Rubiaceae. It is a tree with papery leaves, green to yellow flowers, and capsule fruits. The species is native to Ecuador.

Cinchona mutisii was described in 1821, and is listed as Endangered by the IUCN.

== Taxonomy ==
The species was described by Aylmer Bourke Lambert in 1821. Paul Carpenter Standley treated it as a synonym of Cinchona pubescens.

== Distribution ==
Cinchona mutisii is native to the wet tropical biome of southern Ecuador. It grows at elevations of 2,000–3,500 metres (6,600–11,500 ft).

== Description ==
Cinchona mutisii is a tree that grows up to 6 metres (20 ft) tall and 15 centimetres (5.9 in) wide.

The leaves are papery when dry, 2.8–7 centimetres (1.1–2.8 in) long, 1.4–3.4 centimetres (0.55–1.34 in) wide, and ovate to oblong in shape. The leaf stems are 0.5–1.3 centimetres (0.20–0.51 in) long.

The calyx is 2.8–4.6 millimetres (0.11–0.18 in) long, and has 0.9–1.8 millimetres (0.035–0.071 in) long lobes. The corolla is tube-shaped, 8.9–12 millimetres (0.35–0.47 in) long, green to yellow on the outside, and dark purplish on the inside. The corolla has 3.5–6.4 millimetres (0.14–0.25 in) long lobes.

The fruit is a dehiscent, ellipsoid capsule, measuring 11–21 millimetres (0.43–0.83 in) long, and 7–10 millimetres (0.28–0.39 in) wide. The seeds are 6.2–7.1 millimetres (0.24–0.28 in) long, and 3.1–3.5 millimetres (0.12–0.14 in) wide.

== Conservation ==
In 2024, the IUCN assessed Cinchona mutisii as Endangered.

== Nomenclature ==
In Spanish, the species is known as Crespilla.
