= Cinchona pitayensis =

Conservation status
- Least Concern (IUCN 3.1)

Scientific classification
- Kingdom: Plantae
- Clade: Tracheophytes
- Clade: Angiosperms
- Clade: Eudicots
- Clade: Asterids
- Order: Gentianales
- Family: Rubiaceae
- Genus: Cinchona
- Species: C. pitayensis

Binomial name
- Cinchona pitayensis Wedd.

Synonyms
- Cinchona condaminea var. pitayensis Wedd.; Cinchona corymbosa H.Karst.; Cinchona pitayensis var. trianae (H.Karst.) Wedd.; Cinchona trianae H.Karst.

Species of flowering plant

Cinchona pitayensis is a species of flowering plant in the family Rubiaceae. It is a tree with papery leaves and capsule fruits. The species is native to Colombia and Ecuador.

Cinchona pitayensis was described in 1849, and is listed as of Least Concern by the IUCN.

== Taxonomy ==
Cinchona pitayensis was described by Hugh Algernon Weddell in 1849. It is closely related to Cinchona macrocalyx.

== Distribution ==
Cinchona pitayensis is native to the wet tropical biome of Colombia and Ecuador. It grows at elevations of 1,500–3,230 metres (4,920–10,600 ft).

== Description ==
Cinchona pitayensis is a tree. It grows up to 15 metres (49 ft) high, and around 30 centimetres (12 in) wide.

The leaves are firmly papery when dry, 5.1–15 centimetres (2.0–5.9 in) long, 2.7–8.3 centimetres (1.1–3.3 in) wide, and elliptical to obovate. The leaves sometimes have tuft domatia. The leaf stems are 0.6–2.3 centimetres (0.24–0.91 in) long.

The calyx is 3.5–6 millimetres (0.14–0.24 in) long, and has 1.9–4.2 millimetres (0.075–0.165 in) long lobes. The corolla tube is 9–14 millimetres (0.35–0.55 in) long, and has 4–7 millimetres (0.16–0.28 in) long lobes.

The fruit is a dehiscent, ellipsoid to subglobose capsule, measuring 9–24 millimetres (0.35–0.94 in) long, and 6–9 millimetres (0.24–0.35 in) wide. The endocarp is woody, and 0.4–0.7 millimetres (0.016–0.028 in) thick. The seeds are 5–7 millimetres (0.20–0.28 in) long, and 2.7–4.4 millimetres (0.11–0.17 in) wide.

== Uses ==
Cinchona pitayensis is used in medicine.

== Conservation ==
In 2023, the IUCN assessed Cinchona pitayensis as of Least Concern.

== Nomenclature ==
In Spanish, the species is known as cascarilla. In Portuguese, it is known as quineira.
