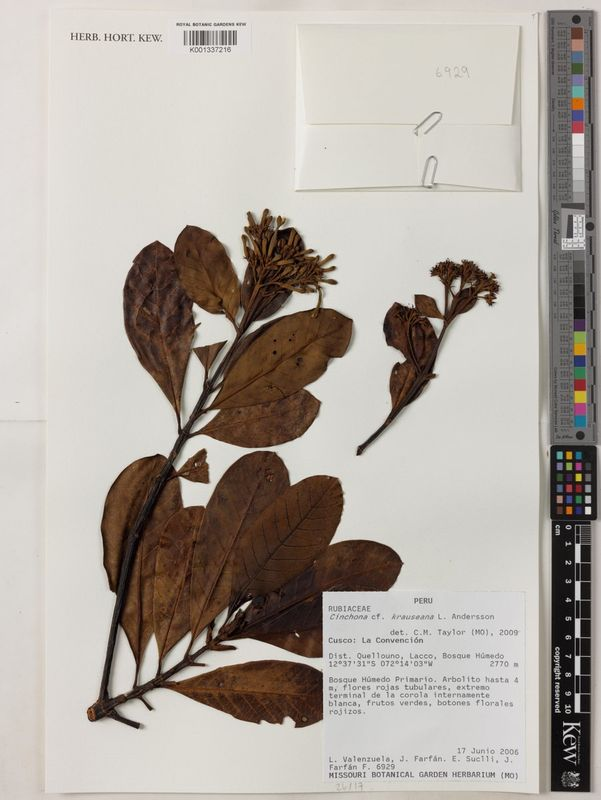

Scientific classification
- Kingdom: Plantae
- Clade: Embryophytes
- Clade: Tracheophytes
- Clade: Angiosperms
- Clade: Eudicots
- Clade: Asterids
- Order: Gentianales
- Family: Rubiaceae
- Genus: Cinchona
- Species: C. krauseana

Binomial name
- Cinchona krauseana L.Andersson

Synonyms
- Ladenbergia coriacea K.Krause

= Cinchona krauseana =

Species of flowering plant

Cinchona krauseana is a species of flowering plant in the family Rubiaceae. It is a shrub or tree with papery leaves, pink flowers, and capsule fruits. The species is native to Peru, and was described in 1908.

== Taxonomy ==
The species was first described by Kurt Krause in 1908, as Ladenbergia coriacea. It was placed in Ladenbergia due to its capsules, which split open from the apex to the base. In 1998, Bengt Lennart Andersson described the species under its current name.

== Distribution ==
Cinchona krauseana is native to the wet tropical biome of Amazonas, Peru. The species has been collected from an elevation of 2,680 metres (8,790 ft).

== Description ==
Cinchona krauseana is a shrub or tree that grows to 4 metres (13 ft) high.

The leaves are firmly papery, 3.7–7 centimetres (1.5–2.8 in) long, 1.7–4.4 centimetres (0.67–1.73 in) wide, and elliptical. The edges are curved downwards. The leaf stem is 3–8 millimetres (0.12–0.31 in) long.

The calyx is 3.2–3.6 millimetres (0.13–0.14 in) long, and has 1.5–1.9 millimetres (0.059–0.075 in) lobes. The corolla is a pink, 12–20 millimetres (0.47–0.79 in) long tube, which has 5.5–9.7 millimetres (0.22–0.38 in) long lobes.

The fruit is an ellipsoid capsule that splits open from the apex to the base. The capsule is 8–18 millimetres (0.31–0.71 in) long, 5–14 millimetres (0.20–0.55 in) wide, and has a woody endocarp. The seeds are around 5.1 millimetres (0.20 in) long, and 3.9 millimetres (0.15 in) wide.

Cinchona krauseana is similar to Cinchona hirsuta and Cinchona macrocalyx.
