= Cinchona scrobiculata =

Conservation status
- Endangered (IUCN 3.1)

Scientific classification
- Kingdom: Plantae
- Clade: Tracheophytes
- Clade: Angiosperms
- Clade: Eudicots
- Clade: Asterids
- Order: Gentianales
- Family: Rubiaceae
- Genus: Cinchona
- Species: C. scrobiculata

Binomial name
- Cinchona scrobiculata Bonpl.

Synonyms
- Cinchona scrobiculata var. genuina Wedd.; Cinchona umbellulifera Pav. ex Howard

Species of flowering plant

Cinchona scrobiculata is a species of flowering plant in the family Rubiaceae. It is a tree with papery leaves and dehiscent capsule fruits. The species is native to Peru.

Cinchona scrobiculata was described in 1807, and is listed as Endangered by the IUCN.

== Taxonomy ==
The species was described by Aimé Bonpland in 1807. Paul Carpenter Standley treated it as a synonym of Cinchona pubescens.

== Distribution ==
Cinchona scrobiculata is native to the seasonally dry tropical biome of Cajamarca, Peru. It grows at elevations of 1,300–2,500 metres (4,300–8,200 ft).

== Description ==
Cinchona scrobiculata is a tree. It grows up to 12 metres (39 ft).

The leaves are elliptical to obovate, papery when dry, 13–25 centimetres (5.1–9.8 in) long, and 7.2–11 centimetres (2.8–4.3 in) wide. The leaves have distinct domatia. The leaf stems are 0.4–2 centimetres (0.16–0.79 in) long.

The calyx is 2–2.4 millimetres (0.079–0.094 in) long, and has triangular, 0.5–0.8 millimetres (0.020–0.031 in) long lobes. The corolla has a tube around 8 millimetres (0.31 in) long. The tube has lobes which are around 2.9 millimetres (0.11 in) long.

The fruit is a dehiscent, 5–18 millimetres (0.20–0.71 in) long, 3–6 millimetres (0.12–0.24 in) wide capsule. The endocarp is papery, and around 0.15 millimetres (0.0059 in) thick. The seeds are elliptical, 3.7–6.3 millimetres (0.15–0.25 in) long, and 1.5–2 millimetres (0.059–0.079 in) wide.

== Conservation ==
In 2022, the IUCN assessed Cinchona scrobiculata as Endangered.
