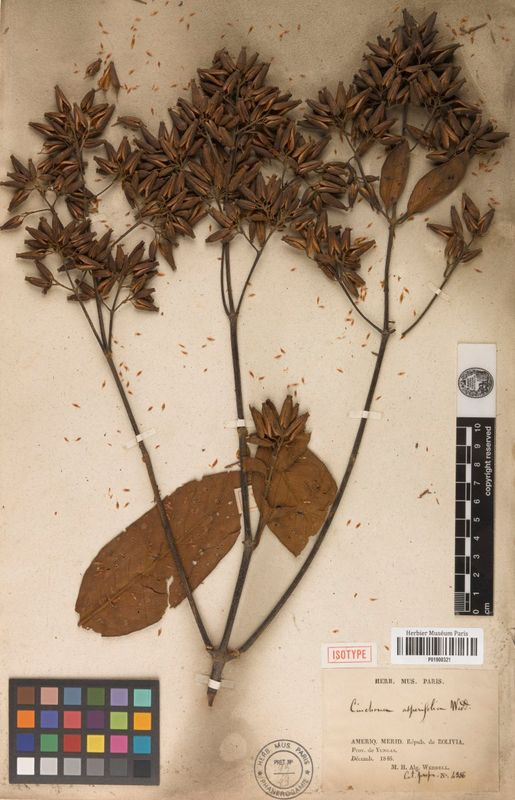

Conservation status
- Endangered (IUCN 3.1)

Scientific classification
- Kingdom: Plantae
- Clade: Embryophytes
- Clade: Tracheophytes
- Clade: Spermatophytes
- Clade: Angiosperms
- Clade: Eudicots
- Clade: Asterids
- Order: Gentianales
- Family: Rubiaceae
- Genus: Cinchona
- Species: C. asperifolia

Binomial name
- Cinchona asperifolia Wedd.

= Cinchona asperifolia =

Species of flowering plant

Cinchona asperifolia is a species of flowering plant in the family Rubiaceae. It is a tree with papery leaves, and capsule fruits. The species is native to Bolivia and Peru.

Cinchona asperifolia was described in 1848, and is listed as Endangered by the IUCN.

== Taxonomy ==
The species was described by Hugh Algernon Weddell in 1848. The type collection was made at Pajonales, at an elevation of around 1,400 metres (4,600 ft).

== Distribution ==
Cinchona asperifolia is native to the seasonally dry tropical biome of Bolivia (La Paz) and Peru. The species grows in forests, at elevations of 1,341–1,498 metres (4,400–4,915 ft).

== Description ==
Cinchona asperifolia is a tree. It grows up to 4 metres (13 ft) high, and the trunk is up to 6 centimetres (2.4 in) wide. The leaf stems are 0.6–2 centimetres (0.24–0.79 in) long. The leaves are ovate to elliptical, 6.3–15 centimetres (2.5–5.9 in) long, 1.6–5.5 centimetres (0.63–2.17 in) wide, and papery when dry.

The calyx is around 1.9 millimetres (0.075 in) long, and has lobes that are around 0.7 millimetres (0.028 in) long. The fruits are capsules, which are 10–22 millimetres (0.39–0.87 in) long, 4–5 millimetres (0.16–0.20 in) wide, dehiscent, and have a firm, papery, endocarp. The seeds are irregularly elliptical, 4–5.7 millimetres (0.16–0.22 in) long, and 1.2–1.8 millimetres (0.047–0.071 in) wide.

== Conservation ==
In 2023, the IUCN assessed Cinchona asperifolia as Endangered.
