= Cinchona parabolica =

Scientific classification
- Kingdom: Plantae
- Clade: Tracheophytes
- Clade: Angiosperms
- Clade: Eudicots
- Clade: Asterids
- Order: Gentianales
- Family: Rubiaceae
- Genus: Cinchona
- Species: C. parabolica

Binomial name
- Cinchona parabolica Pav.

Synonyms
- Cinchona delessertiana Standl.; Cinchona mutisii var. crispa Wedd.

Species of flowering plant

Cinchona parabolica is a species of flowering plant in the family Rubiaceae. It is a tree with papery leaves and dehiscent capsule fruits. The species is native to Ecuador and Peru, and was described in 1859.

== Taxonomy ==
The species was described by José Antonio Pavón Jiménez in 1859.

== Distribution ==
Cinchona parabolica is native to the wet tropical biome of south-eastern Ecuador and northern Peru. It grows at elevations of 1,800–2,500 metres (5,900–8,200 ft).

== Description ==
Cinchona parabolica is a tree that grows up to 7 metres (23 ft) high.

When dry, the leaves are firm and papery. The leaves are wrinkled, 6.5–19 centimetres (2.6–7.5 in) long, 5–11 centimetres (2.0–4.3 in) wide, and ovate to obovate in shape. The leaf stems are 0.8–2.7 centimetres (0.31–1.06 in) long.

The calyx is 2.5–3.5 millimetres (0.098–0.138 in) long, and has 0.9–1.3 millimetres (0.035–0.051 in) long lobes. The corolla is a tube around 9 millimetres (0.35 in) long. The corolla lobes are around 4 millimetres (0.16 in) long.

The fruit is a dehiscent, 11–33 millimetres (0.43–1.30 in) long, 5–8 millimetres (0.20–0.31 in) wide capsule. The endocarp is firmly papery when dry. The seeds are 3.9–10 millimetres (0.15–0.39 in) long, and 1.6–2.6 millimetres (0.063–0.102 in) wide.
