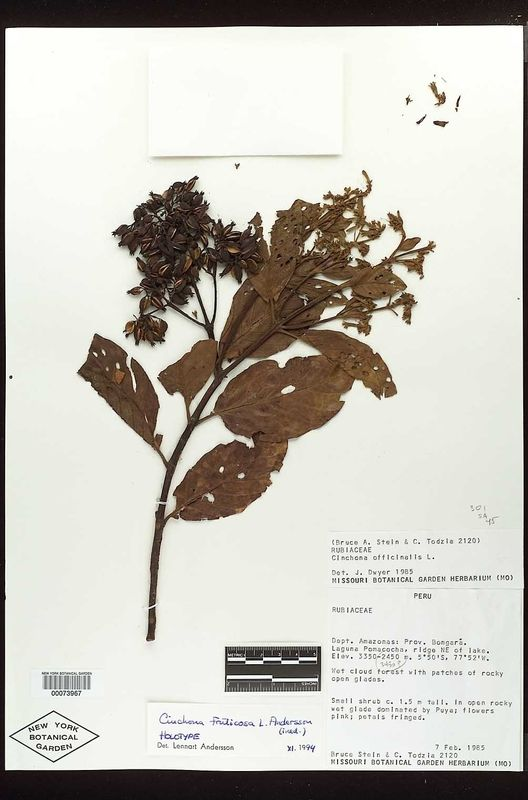

Scientific classification
- Kingdom: Plantae
- Clade: Embryophytes
- Clade: Tracheophytes
- Clade: Spermatophytes
- Clade: Angiosperms
- Clade: Eudicots
- Clade: Asterids
- Order: Gentianales
- Family: Rubiaceae
- Genus: Cinchona
- Species: C. fruticosa

Binomial name
- Cinchona fruticosa L.Andersson

= Cinchona fruticosa =

Species of flowering plant

Cinchona fruticosa is a species of flowering plant in the family Rubiaceae. It is a shrub with papery leaves, pink flowers, and capsule fruits. The species is native to Peru, and was described in 1998.

== Taxonomy ==
The species was described by Bengt Lennart Andersson in 1998.

== Distribution ==
Cinchona fruticosa is native to the wet tropical biome of Amazonas, Peru. The species has been found in open glades, in cloud forests dominated by Puya. It has been found at altitudes of 2,200–3,350 metres (7,220–10,990 ft).

== Description ==
Cinchona fruticosa is a shrub. It grows to around 1.5 metres (4.9 ft) high. The leaf stems are 1–1.6 centimetres (0.39–0.63 in) long. The leaves are papery when dry, ovate to elliptical and shape, 5.6–9 centimetres (2.2–3.5 in) long, and 2–4.6 centimetres (0.79–1.81 in) wide.

The calyx is around 3.2 millimetres (0.13 in) long, and has narrowly triangular lobes. The lobes are around 1.7 millimetres (0.067 in) long. The corolla is a pink tube around 8 millimetres (0.31 in) long, and has lobes which are around 3.3 millimetres (0.13 in) long.

The fruits are dehiscent capsules, which are 6–14 millimetres (0.24–0.55 in) long, and 3–5 millimetres (0.12–0.20 in) wide. The endocarp is more or less papery. The seeds are irregularly oblong, 3.6–4.4 millimetres (0.14–0.17 in) long, and up to 1.5 millimetres (0.059 in) wide.
