= Cinchona nitida =

Conservation status
- Endangered (IUCN 3.1)

Scientific classification
- Kingdom: Plantae
- Clade: Tracheophytes
- Clade: Angiosperms
- Clade: Eudicots
- Clade: Asterids
- Order: Gentianales
- Family: Rubiaceae
- Genus: Cinchona
- Species: C. nitida

Binomial name
- Cinchona nitida Ruiz & Pav.

Synonyms
- Cinchona lancifolia var. nitida (Ruiz & Pav.) Schult.; Cinchona peruviana var. nitida (Ruiz & Pav.) Howard; Cinchona discolor Klotzsch; Cinchona stenosiphon K.Krause

Species of flowering plant

Cinchona nitida is a species of flowering plant in the family Rubiaceae. It is a shrub or tree with pink flowers and capsule fruits. The species is native to Peru.

Cinchona nitida was described in 1799, and is listed as Endangered by the IUCN.

== Taxonomy ==
The species was described by Hipólito Ruiz López and José Antonio Pavón Jiménez in 1799. Paul Carpenter Standley treated Cinchona nitida as a synonym of Cinchona officinalis.

== Distribution ==
Cinchona nitida is native to the wet tropical biome of Huánuco, Peru. It grows mainly in elfin forests and boggy areas, at elevations of 1,500–3,000 metres (4,900–9,800 ft).

== Description ==
Cinchona nitida is a shrub or tree that grows up to 9 metres (30 ft) high.

The leaves are obovate, more or less papery when dry, 5.6–16 centimetres (2.2–6.3 in) long, 2.2–6.5 centimetres (0.87–2.56 in) wide, and sometimes have small, indistinct domatia. The leaf stems are 0.6–1.9 centimetres (0.24–0.75 in) long.

The calyx is 2.5–2.9 millimetres (0.098–0.114 in) long, and has triangular, 1.1–1.3 millimetres (0.043–0.051 in) long lobes. The corolla is a pinkish tube, measuring 14–15 millimetres (0.55–0.59 in) long, and has 4–6.1 millimetres (0.16–0.24 in) long lobes.

The fruits are dehiscent capsules, measuring 12–23 millimetres (0.47–0.91 in) long, and 4–5 millimetres (0.16–0.20 in) wide. The endocarp is papery. The seeds are irregularly oblong, 6.1–7.9 millimetres (0.24–0.31 in) long, and 1.5–1.6 millimetres (0.059–0.063 in) wide.

== Conservation ==
In 2022, the IUCN assessed Cinchona nitida as Endangered.

== Nomenclature ==
In Spanish, the species is known as Árbol de las Calenturas, Quina, Cascarilla Roja del Cusco, Cascarilla Roja, Cascarilla Lustrosa, or Cascarilla.
