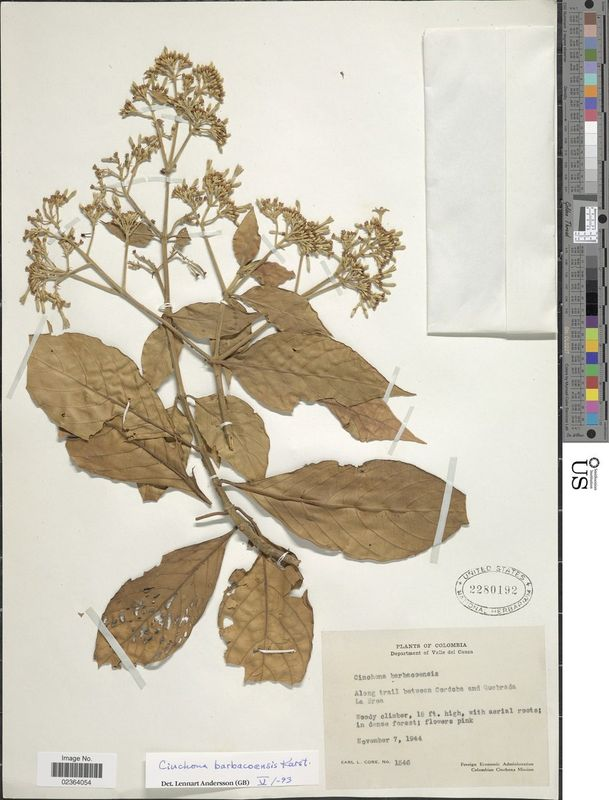

Conservation status
- Least Concern (IUCN 3.1)

Scientific classification
- Kingdom: Plantae
- Clade: Embryophytes
- Clade: Tracheophytes
- Clade: Angiosperms
- Clade: Eudicots
- Clade: Asterids
- Order: Gentianales
- Family: Rubiaceae
- Genus: Cinchona
- Species: C. barbacoensis

Binomial name
- Cinchona barbacoensis H.Karst

= Cinchona barbacoensis =

Species of flowering plant

Cinchona barbacoensis is a species of flowering plant in the family Rubiaceae. It is a shrub, tree, or liana, with papery leaves, pinkish flowers, and dehiscent capsule fruits. The species is native to Colombia and Ecuador.

Cinchona barbacoensis was described in 1859, and is listed as of Least Concern by the IUCN.

== Taxonomy ==
The species was described by Gustav Karl Wilhelm Hermann Karsten in 1859.

== Distribution ==
Cinchona barbacoensis is native to western Colombia and Carchi Province, Ecuador. It grows at elevations of up to 1,800 metres (5,900 ft), but usually below 1,500 metres (4,900 ft).

== Description ==
Cinchona barbacoensis is a shrub, tree, or liana that grows up to 9 metres (30 ft) high.

The leaves are papery when dry, elliptical or obovate, 6.5–20 centimetres (2.6–7.9 in) long, and 1.8–10 centimetres (0.71–3.94 in) wide. The leaf stems are 0.5–3 centimetres (0.20–1.18 in) long.

The calyx is 1.5–2.6 millimetres (0.059–0.102 in) long, and has 0.2–0.6 millimetres (0.0079–0.0236 in) long lobes. The corolla is a pinkish tube, measuring 5–8.2 millimetres (0.20–0.32 in) long. The tube has 3.2–5.3 millimetres (0.13–0.21 in) long lobes.

The fruits are dehiscent, more or less cylindrical capsules, measuring 4.5–12 centimetres (1.8–4.7 in) long, and 4–5 millimetres (0.16–0.20 in) wide. The endocarp is more or less papery. The seens are around 24 millimetres (0.94 in) long, and 1.5–2 millimetres (0.059–0.079 in) wide.

The species is distinguished by its short calyx lobes, long capsules, and long, narrow seeds.

== Hybrids ==
Cinchona barbacoensis may hybridise with Cinchona pubescens.

== Uses ==
Cinchona barbacoensis is used as a medicine.

== Conservation ==
In 2023, the IUCN assessed Cinchona barbacoensis as of Least Concern.
