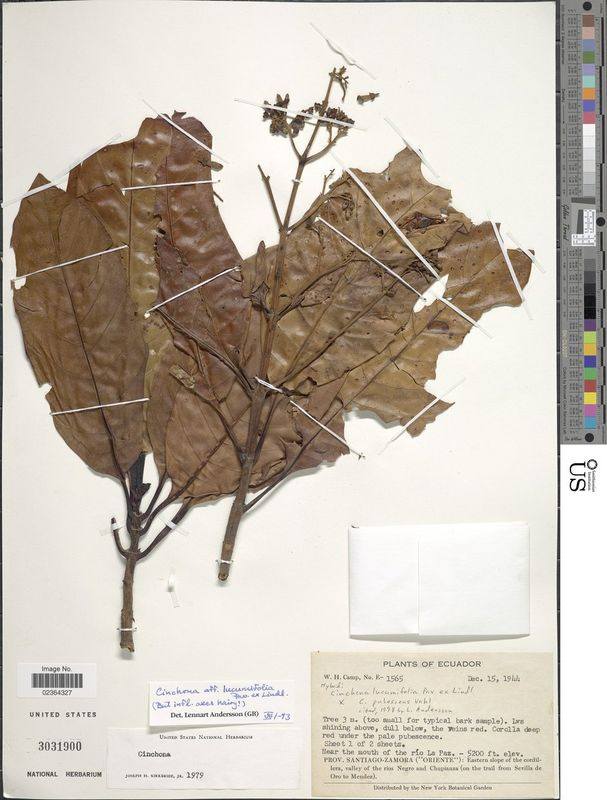

Conservation status
- Vulnerable (IUCN 3.1)

Scientific classification
- Kingdom: Plantae
- Clade: Embryophytes
- Clade: Tracheophytes
- Clade: Angiosperms
- Clade: Eudicots
- Clade: Asterids
- Order: Gentianales
- Family: Rubiaceae
- Genus: Cinchona
- Species: C. lucumifolia

Binomial name
- Cinchona lucumifolia Pav. ex Lindl.

Synonyms
- Cinchona condaminea var. lucumifolia (Pav. ex Lindl.) Wedd.; Cinchona macrocalyx var. lucumifolia DC.

= Cinchona lucumifolia =

Species of flowering plant

Cinchona lucumifolia is a species of flowering plant in the family Rubiaceae. It is a tree with papery leaves, violet or purplish flowers, and capsule fruits. The species is native to Ecuador.

Cinchona lucumifolia was described in 1838, and is listed as Vulnerable by the IUCN.

== Taxonomy ==
Cinchona lucumifolia was first validly published by John Lindley in 1838, following an earlier invalid publication by José Antonio Pavón Jiménez.

Paul Carpenter Standley treated Cinchona lucumifolia as a synonym of Cinchona officinalis.

== Distribution ==
Cinchona lucumifolia is native to the wet tropical biome of Ecuador. It grows at elevations of 1,500–3,000 metres (4,900–9,800 ft), on the slopes of the eastern cordillera.

== Description ==
Cinchona lucumifolia is a tree that grows up to 10 metres (33 ft) high, and around 30 centimetres (12 in) wide at breast height.

The leaves are papery when dry, elliptical or oblong, 6.1–11 centimetres (2.4–4.3 in) long, and 2.2–4.2 centimetres (0.87–1.65 in) wide. The edges are rolled downwards slightly. The leaves rarely have indistinct domatia. The leaf stems are 1–4.2 centimetres (0.39–1.65 in) long.

The calyx is 2.7–3 millimetres (0.11–0.12 in) long, and has 0.9–1.4 millimetres (0.035–0.055 in) long lobes. The corolla is a violet or purplish tube, measuring 7–11 millimetres (0.28–0.43 in) long, with 4–7 millimetres (0.16–0.28 in) long lobes.

The fruit is a dehiscent, ellipsoid to subglobose capsule. The capsule is 11–13 millimetres (0.43–0.51 in) long, 5–10 millimetres (0.20–0.39 in) wide, and has a woody endocarp. The seeds are 4.5–6 millimetres (0.18–0.24 in) long, and 2.3–2.4 millimetres (0.091–0.094 in) wide.

Cinchona lucumifolia may hybridise with Cinchona pubescens, which is a sympatric species.

== Conservation ==
In 2024, the IUCN assessed Cinchona lucumifolia as Vulnerable.

== Nomenclature ==
In Spanish, the species is known as fina costrona.
