= Fernando Mendes =

Fernando Mendes may refer to:

- Fernando Mendes (physician) (died 1724), Portuguese Jewish physician
- Fernando Mendes (cyclist) (1946–2001), Portuguese cyclist
- Fernando Mendes (footballer born 1937) (1937–2016), Portuguese football midfielder and manager
- Fernando Mendes (footballer born 1966), Portuguese retired footballer who played as a left defender
