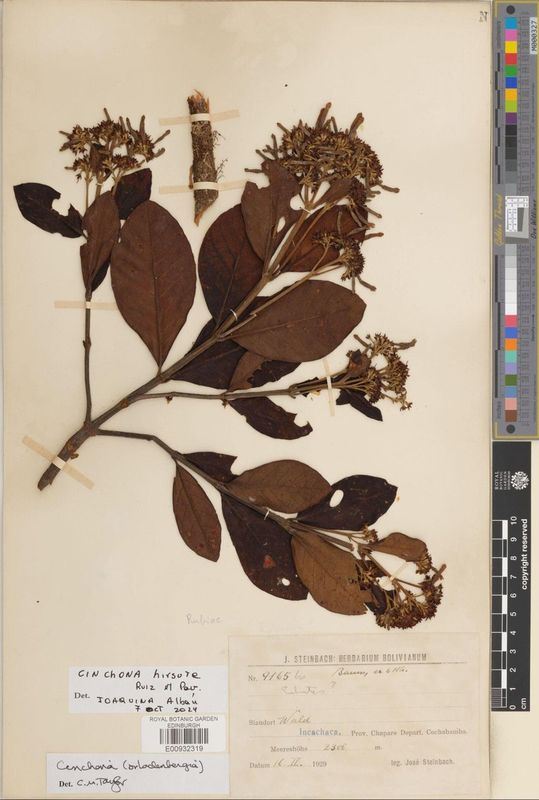

Conservation status
- Endangered (IUCN 3.1)

Scientific classification
- Kingdom: Plantae
- Clade: Embryophytes
- Clade: Tracheophytes
- Clade: Spermatophytes
- Clade: Angiosperms
- Clade: Eudicots
- Clade: Asterids
- Order: Gentianales
- Family: Rubiaceae
- Genus: Cinchona
- Species: C. hirsuta

Binomial name
- Cinchona hirsuta Ruiz & Pav.

Synonyms
- Cinchona pubescens var. hirsuta (Ruiz & Pav.) DC.; Cinchona tenuis Ruiz ex DC.; Cinchona tenuis Vell.

= Cinchona hirsuta =

Species of flowering plant

Cinchona hirsuta is a species of flowering plant in the family Rubiaceae. It is a tree with papery leaves, reddish flowers, and capsule fruits. The species is native to Bolivia and Peru.

Cinchona hirsuta was described in 1799, and has been assessed as endangered by the IUCN.

== Taxonomy ==
The species was described by Hipólito Ruiz López and José Antonio Pavón Jiménez in 1799.

== Distribution ==
Cinchona hirsuta is native to the wet tropical biome of Bolivia and Peru. The species grows in forests, at elevations of 1,700–3,100 metres (5,600–10,200 ft).

== Description ==
Cinchona hirsuta is a tree that grows up to 12 metres (39 ft) tall.

The leaf stems are 0.3–1.5 centimetres (0.12–0.59 in) long. The leaves are elliptical to obovate, firm and papery, 5.4–11 centimetres (2.1–4.3 in) long, and 1.9–6.8 centimetres (0.75–2.68 in) wide. The leaves may have small domatia.

The calyx is 3.6–6 millimetres (0.14–0.24 in) long, and has 2.5–4 millimetres (0.098–0.157 in) long lobes. The corolla is reddish, 12–18 millimetres (0.47–0.71 in) long, and tube-shaped. The corolla has 4.4–9.6 millimetres (0.17–0.38 in) long lobes.

The fruit is a more or less ellipsoid capsule, which is 12–31 millimetres (0.47–1.22 in) long, and 9–12 millimetres (0.35–0.47 in) wide. The capsule has a woody endocarp. The seeds are 6.5–12 millimetres (0.26–0.47 in) long, and 2.8–4.3 millimetres (0.11–0.17 in) wide.

== Conservation ==
In 2022, the IUCN assessed Cinchona hirsuta as endangered.

== Nomenclature ==
In Spanish, the species is known as Charichuelo, Cascarilla Negrilla, Cascarilla Hojas de Roble, Cascarilla Delgadilla, Cascarilla Delgada, Cascarilla Colorada, or Cascarilla.
