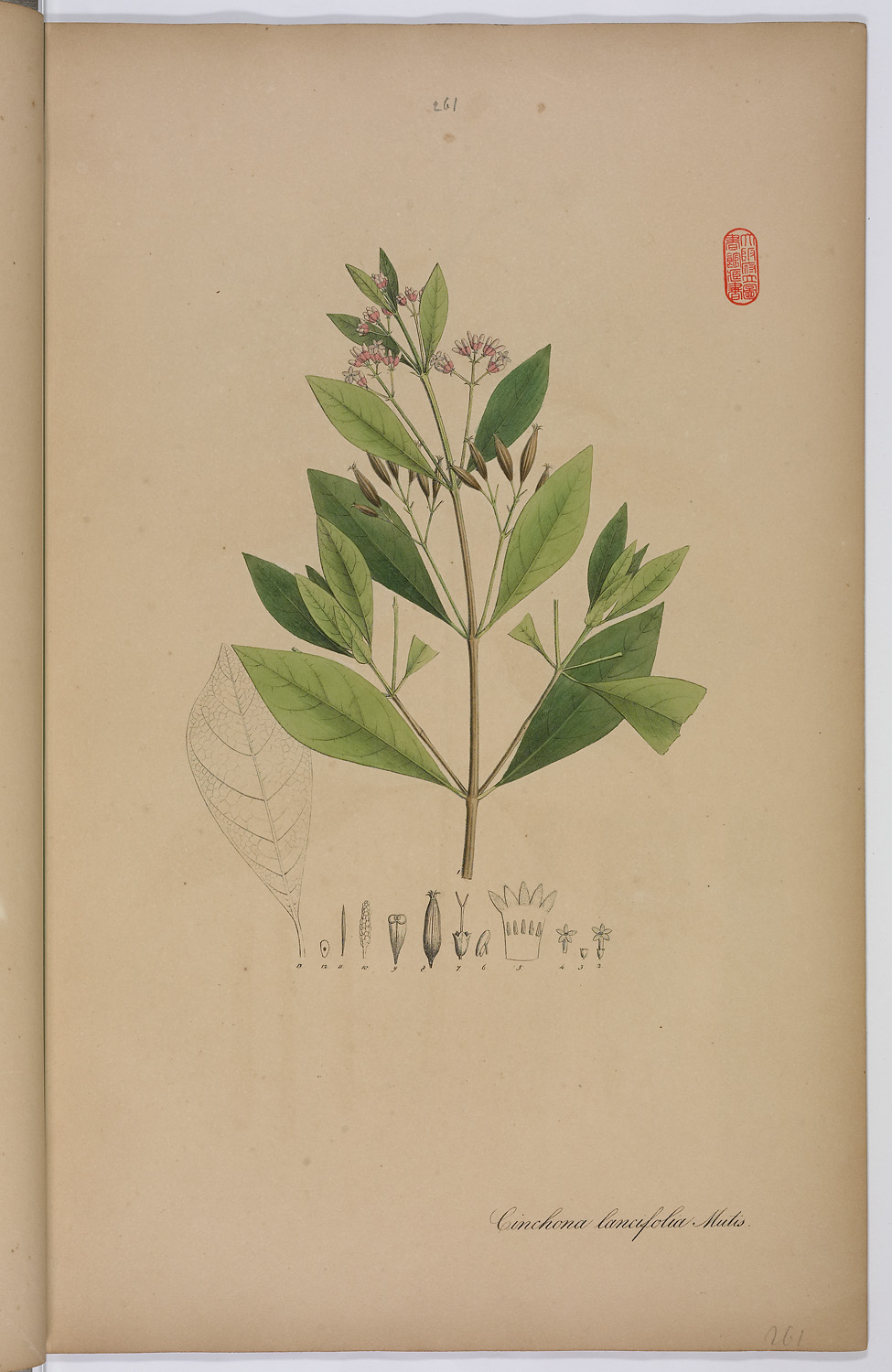

Scientific classification
- Kingdom: Plantae
- Clade: Embryophytes
- Clade: Tracheophytes
- Clade: Angiosperms
- Clade: Eudicots
- Clade: Asterids
- Order: Gentianales
- Family: Rubiaceae
- Genus: Cinchona
- Species: C. lancifolia

Binomial name
- Cinchona lancifolia Mutis

Synonyms
- Cinchona condaminea var. lancifolia (Mutis) Wedd.; Cinchona lancifolia var. vera Howard; Quinquina lancifolia (Mutis) Kuntze; Cinchona angustifolia Ruiz; Cinchona lancifolia var. angustifolia DC.; Cinchona lancifolia var. discolor H.Karst.; Cinchona tunita López ex Triana

= Cinchona lancifolia =

Species of flowering plant

Cinchona lancifolia is a species of flowering plant in the family Rubiaceae. It is a tree with papery leaves, purplish flowers, and capsule fruits. The species is native to Colombia, Ecuador, and Venezuela, and was described in 1793.

== Taxonomy ==
The species was described by José Celestino Mutis in 1793.

== Distribution ==
Cinchona lancifolia is native to the wet tropical biome of Colombia, Ecuador (Tungurahua), and Venezuela (Mérida, Táchira, and Trujillo). The species is present at elevations of 1,680–2,900 metres (5,510–9,510 ft).

== Description ==
Cinchona lancifolia is a tree. It grows up to 15 metres (49 ft) high, and is around 20 centimetres (0.66 ft) wide.

The leaf stems are 0.3–7 centimetres (0.12–2.76 in) long. The leaves are thinly papery when dry, elliptic to obovate, 6.3–15 centimetres (2.5–5.9 in) long, and 2.7–5.6 centimetres (1.1–2.2 in) wide. The leaves normally have domatia. The leaf edges are slightly rolled down.

The calyx is 2.5–4.8 millimetres (0.098–0.189 in) long, and has 0.8–1.4 millimetres (0.031–0.055 in) lobes. The corolla is purplish, 8.3–12 millimetres (0.33–0.47 in), and has 3.2–4.8 millimetres (0.13–0.19 in) long lobes.

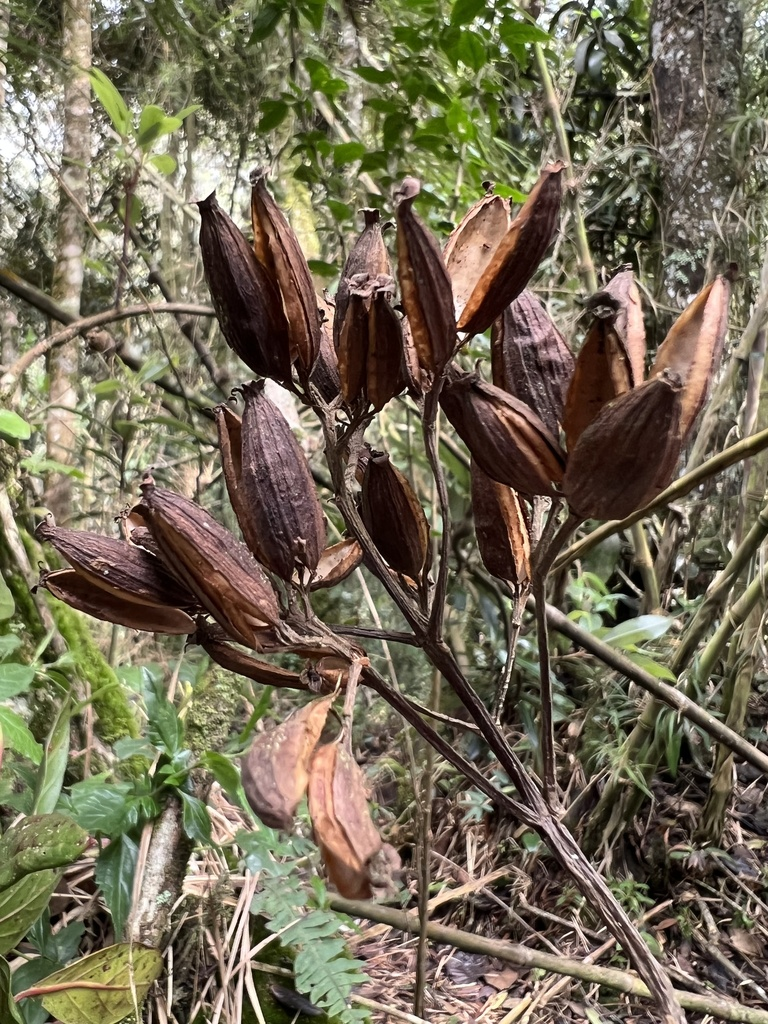
Fruits

The fruits are dehiscent, ellipsoid to subglobose capsules. The capsules are 10–28 millimetres (0.39–1.10 in) long, 5–7 millimetres (0.20–0.28 in) wide, and have a firm papery endocarp. The seeds are 7–11 millimetres (0.28–0.43 in) long, and 1.8–4.6 millimetres (0.071–0.181 in) wide.

== Uses ==
Cinchona lancifolia is used in medicine.
