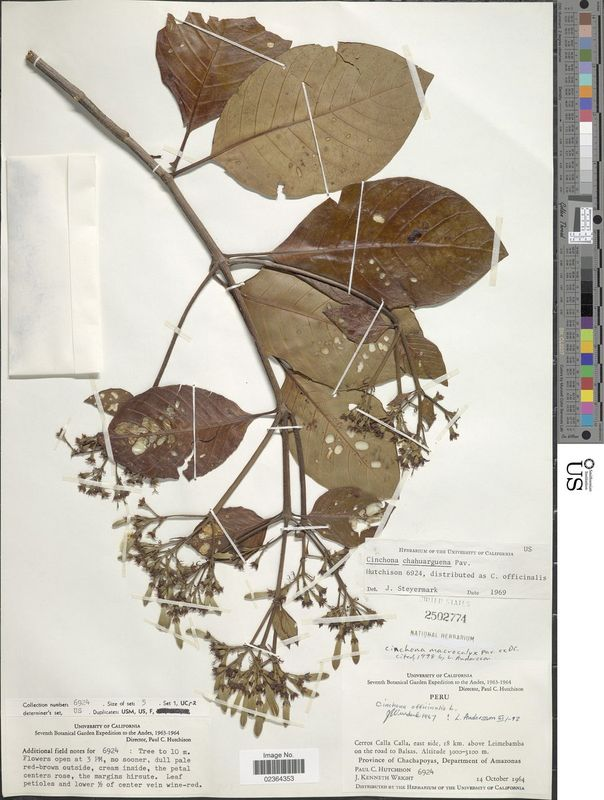

Conservation status
- Least Concern (IUCN 3.1)

Scientific classification
- Kingdom: Plantae
- Clade: Embryophytes
- Clade: Tracheophytes
- Clade: Angiosperms
- Clade: Eudicots
- Clade: Asterids
- Order: Gentianales
- Family: Rubiaceae
- Genus: Cinchona
- Species: C. macrocalyx

Binomial name
- Cinchona macrocalyx Pav. ex DC.

Synonyms
- Cinchona bonplandiana Klotzsch; Cinchona coccinea Pav.; Cinchona condaminea var. candollii Wedd.; Cinchona erythrantha Pav.; Cinchona heterophylla Pav.; Cinchona pubescens var. heterophylla Pav. ex DC.; Cinchona violacea Pav.; Quinquina coccinea (Pav.) Kuntze; Quinquina heterophylla (Pav.) Kuntze

= Cinchona macrocalyx =

Species of flowering plant

Cinchona macrocalyx is a species of flowering plant in the family Rubiaceae. It is a tree with papery leaves, red flowers, and capsule fruits. The species is native to Bolivia, Ecuador, and Peru.

Cinchona macrocalyx was described in 1829, and is listed as of Least Concern by the IUCN.

== Taxonomy ==
The name Cinchona macrocalyx was first validly published by Augustin Pyramus de Candolle in 1829, following an earlier invalid publication by José Antonio Pavón Jiménez.

== Distribution ==
Cinchona macrocalyx is native to the wet tropical biome of Bolivia, Ecuador (Bolívar), and Peru (Cajamarca). It grows in the Andes, at elevations of 2,500–3,000 metres (8,200–9,800 ft).

== Description ==
Cinchona macrocalyx is a tree that grows up to 12 metres (39 ft) high, and around 20 centimetres (7.9 in) wide. The leaf stems are 0.5–2 centimetres (0.20–0.79 in) long. The leaves are papery when dry, elliptic to almost circular in shape, 4–10 centimetres (1.6–3.9 in) long, and 2.8–9.6 centimetres (1.1–3.8 in) wide. The upper surface of the leaves is glossy. The leaves may have domatia.

The calyx is 2.8–4.8 millimetres (0.11–0.19 in) long, and has 1.1–3.8 millimetres (0.043–0.150 in) long lobes. The corolla is reddish, 9–13 millimetres (0.35–0.51 in) long, and has 5–9 millimetres (0.20–0.35 in) lobes.

The fruit is a dehiscent, more or less ellipsoid to roughly spherical capsule, measuring 10–47 millimetres (0.39–1.85 in) long and 5–12 millimetres (0.20–0.47 in) wide. The endocarp is woody. The seeds are 8–10 millimetres (0.31–0.39 in) long, and 2.9–3.5 millimetres (0.11–0.14 in) wide.

== Conservation ==
In 2018, the IUCN assessed Cinchona macrocalyx as of Least Concern. It has a large, stable population, and faces no major threats.
