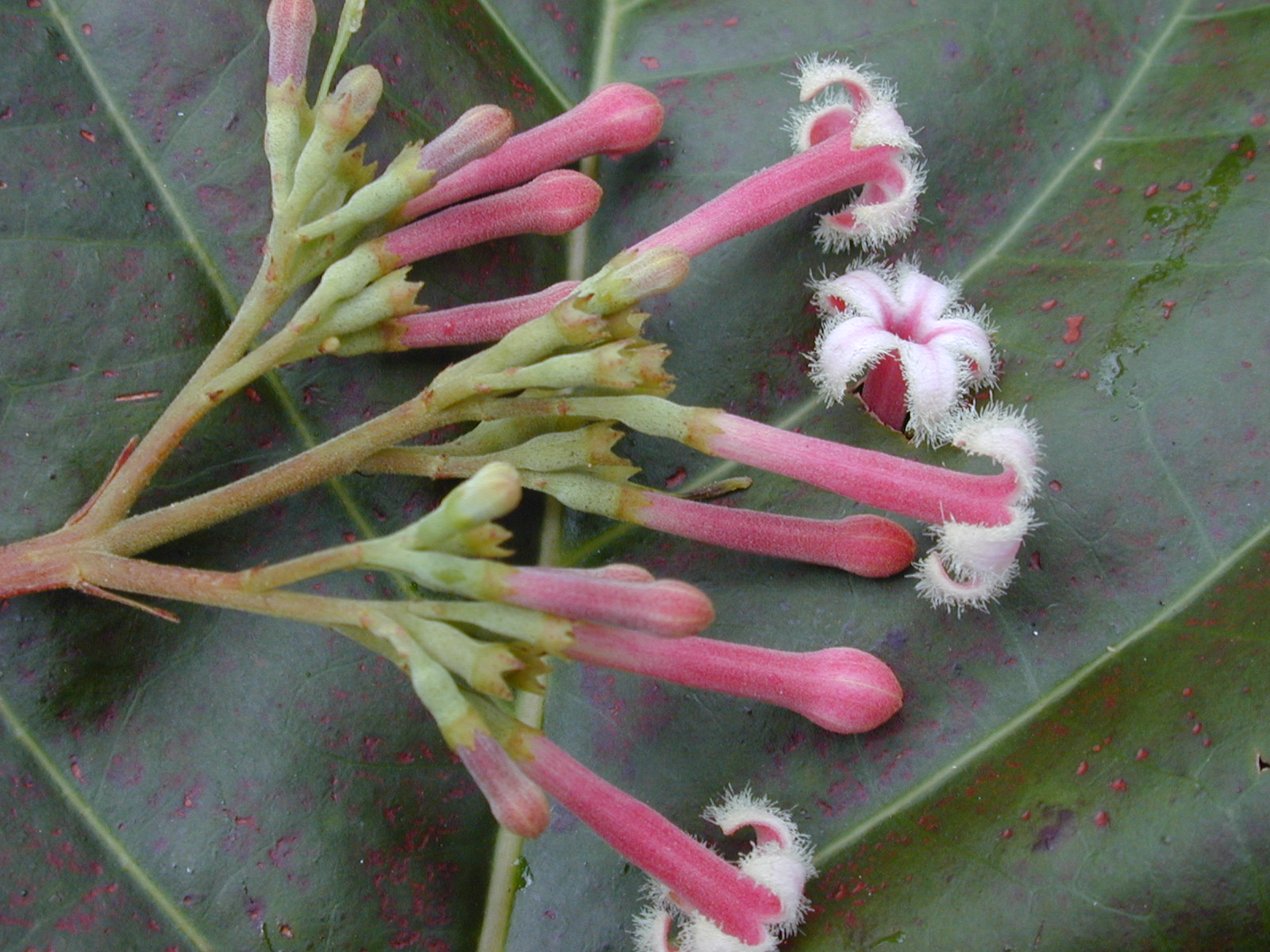

Conservation status
- Least Concern (IUCN 3.1)

Scientific classification
- Kingdom: Plantae
- Clade: Embryophytes
- Clade: Tracheophytes
- Clade: Angiosperms
- Clade: Eudicots
- Clade: Asterids
- Order: Gentianales
- Family: Rubiaceae
- Genus: Cinchona
- Species: C. pubescens

Binomial name
- Cinchona pubescens Vahl, 1790
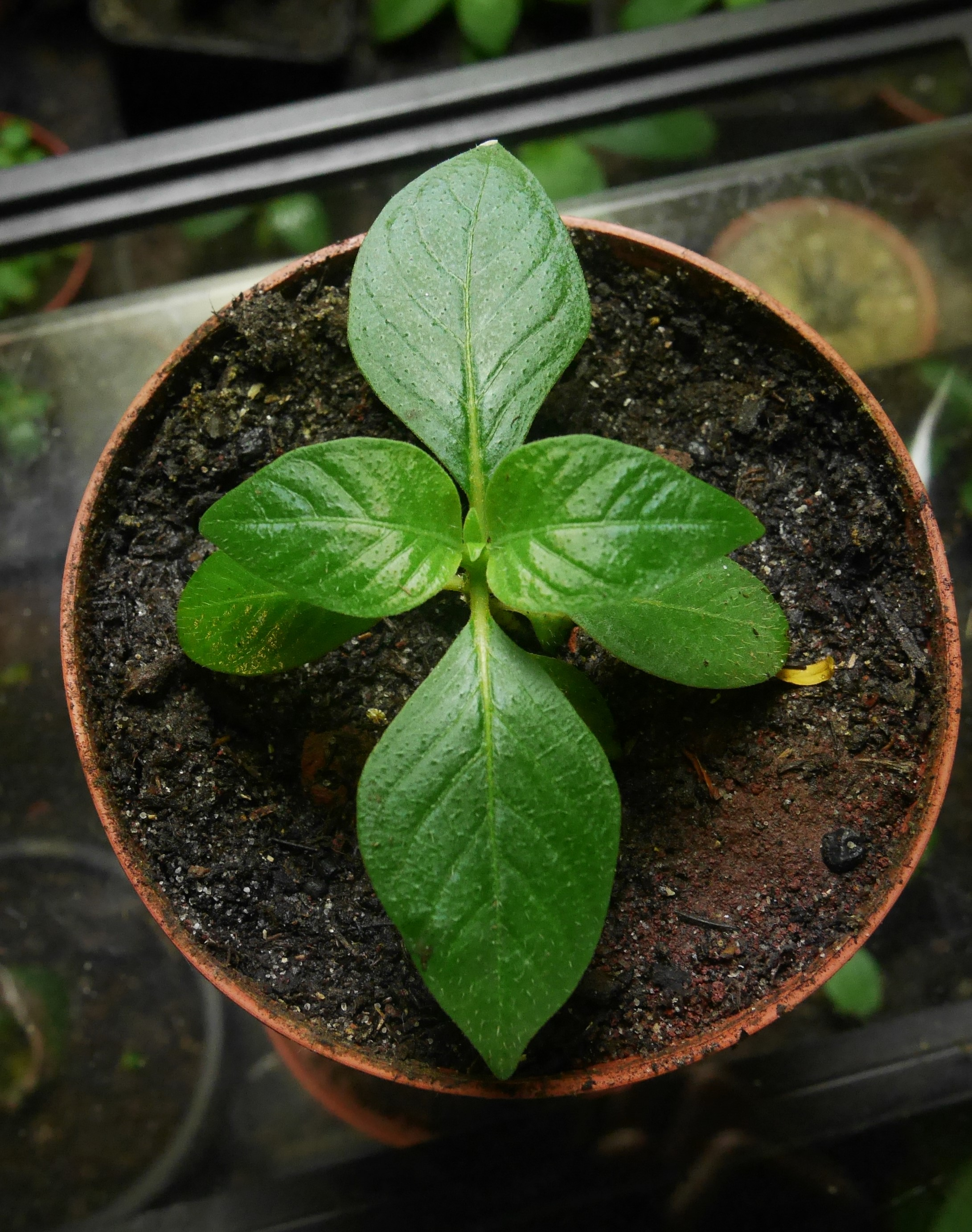

Synonyms
- See § Synonyms.

= Cinchona pubescens =

Species of plant

Cinchona pubescens, also known as red cinchona and quina or kina (Spanish: Cascarilla, cinchona; Portuguese: quina-do-amazonas, quineira), is native to Central and South America. It is known as a medicinal plant for its bark's high quinine content- and has similar uses to C. officinalis in the production of quinine, most famously used for treatment of malaria.

== Description ==
C. pubescens varies from small to large in size, growing to 10 metres (33 ft) in height. When cut, the bark tends to turn red. Leaves are elliptical to oblate and thin. The leaves have pubescent teeth that turn red when they are older, hence its nickname the red quinine tree. Its flowers form in large panicles. They are pink and fragrant, while in the Galapagos they are light pink.

=== Synonyms ===
Taxonomic synonyms include:

- Cinchona caloptera Miq.
- Cinchona chomeliana Wedd.
- Cinchona coronulata Miq.
- Cinchona decurrentifolia Pav.
- Cinchona elliptica Wedd.
- Cinchona goudotiana Klotzsch ex Triana
- Cinchona govana Miq.
- Cinchona howardiana Kuntze
- Cinchona lechleriana Schltdl.
- Cinchona lutea Pav.
- Cinchona morado Ruiz
- Cinchona ovata Ruiz & Pav.
- Cinchona palescens Vell.
- Cinchona pelalba Pav. ex DC.
- Cinchona pelletieriana Wedd.
- Cinchona platyphylla Wedd.
- Cinchona pubescens var. cordata DC.
- Cinchona pubescens var. ovata (Ruiz & Pav.) DC.
- Cinchona purpurascens Wedd.
- Cinchona purpurea Vell.
- Cinchona purpurea Ruiz & Pav.
- Cinchona rosulenta Howard ex Wedd.
- Cinchona rotundifolia Pav. ex Lamb.
- Cinchona rubicunda Tafalla ex Wedd.
- Cinchona rufinervis Wedd.
- Cinchona rugosa Pav. ex DC.
- Cinchona subsessilis Miq.
- Cinchona succirubra Pav. ex Klotzsch
- Cinchona tucujensis H.Karst.
- Quinquina obovata (Pav. ex Howard) Kuntze
- Quinquina ovata (Ruiz & Pav.) Kuntze
- Quinquina pubescens (Vahl) Kuntze
- Quinquina succirubra (Pav. ex Klotzsch) Kuntze

== Ecology ==
C. pubescens has the widest distribution of all Cinchona species, with the native range spanning Costa Rica, Panama, Venezuela, Colombia, Ecuador, Peru, and Bolivia. In Ecuador it is distributed within an altitude from 300–3,900 metres (980–12,800 ft). It also grows well in volcanic soil with high nutrient levels.

C. pubescens is a resilient species that is able to recover from even extreme damage. If the tree is felled but the stump is left, it can grow back new stalks. If the bark is removed and the xylem is exposed to the elements, the tree will grow the bark back. The tree can even grow back if roots that are left in the ground are larger than 2 cm in diameter.

It reproduces rapidly and spreads its seeds via wind. It reaches maturity and begins seeding in 4 years. Growing at a rate of 1–2 m per year, it quickly reaches a tall height where it can shade out the rest of the native plants. Adult trees grow much slower than juveniles.

== Invasive species ==
It has become an invasive species where planted outside of its native range, especially on tropical climate islands such as the Galapagos, Hawaii, and Tahiti. In the Galapagos it has become a dominant species in the formerly shrub dominated Miconia and Fern-Sedge zones on Santa Cruz Island. It has been subject to control in the Galapagos National Park to reduce its impacts using a variety of methods. However, controlling it over its total range on Santa Cruz island would cost US$1.65 million according to research done through the Charles Darwin Foundation.

According to Jäger et al. 2007, the species richness on Santa Cruz Island, Galapagos Islands has declined by 33% in the Miconia Zone and 10% in the Fern-Sedge Zone since the introduction C. pubescens. It is also invasive in Hawaii, on Maui and the Big Island; C. pubescens was first introduced to these to be cultivated for quinine harvesting.

== Control Strategies ==
There are currently two strategies for removal of C. pubescens. They include a physical method and a chemical method. The physical method involves manually felling adult trees and fully removing the stumps. Samplings must be pulled out of the soil. The chemical method uses herbicides diluted in water and sprayed on hack marks on the bark. Buddenhagen et al. tried this at the Galapagos Island National Park using a mixture of picloram and metsulfuron. This technique has been recommended to be performed in Tahiti and Hawaii since it is an invasive there as well.

Buddenhagen et al. 2004 analyzed data using six different herbicide methods from 1999 to 2002 with a different trial each year: picloram salt, triclopyr ester, triclopyr salt, glyphosate, diesel fuel, and picloram and metsulfuron. The herbicide was sprayed onto the trees where they were hacked with machetes. In the first trial, triclopyr ester could control C. pubescens with 77% chance of the trees dying. In the second trial, a picloram and metsulfuron solution was 100% successful in concentrations greater than 4% solution. In the third trial, picloram- metsulfuron solution of 10% concentrations or higher was successful in eradicating the tree.
