= Eradication of malaria =

Elimination of the mosquito-borne infectious disease

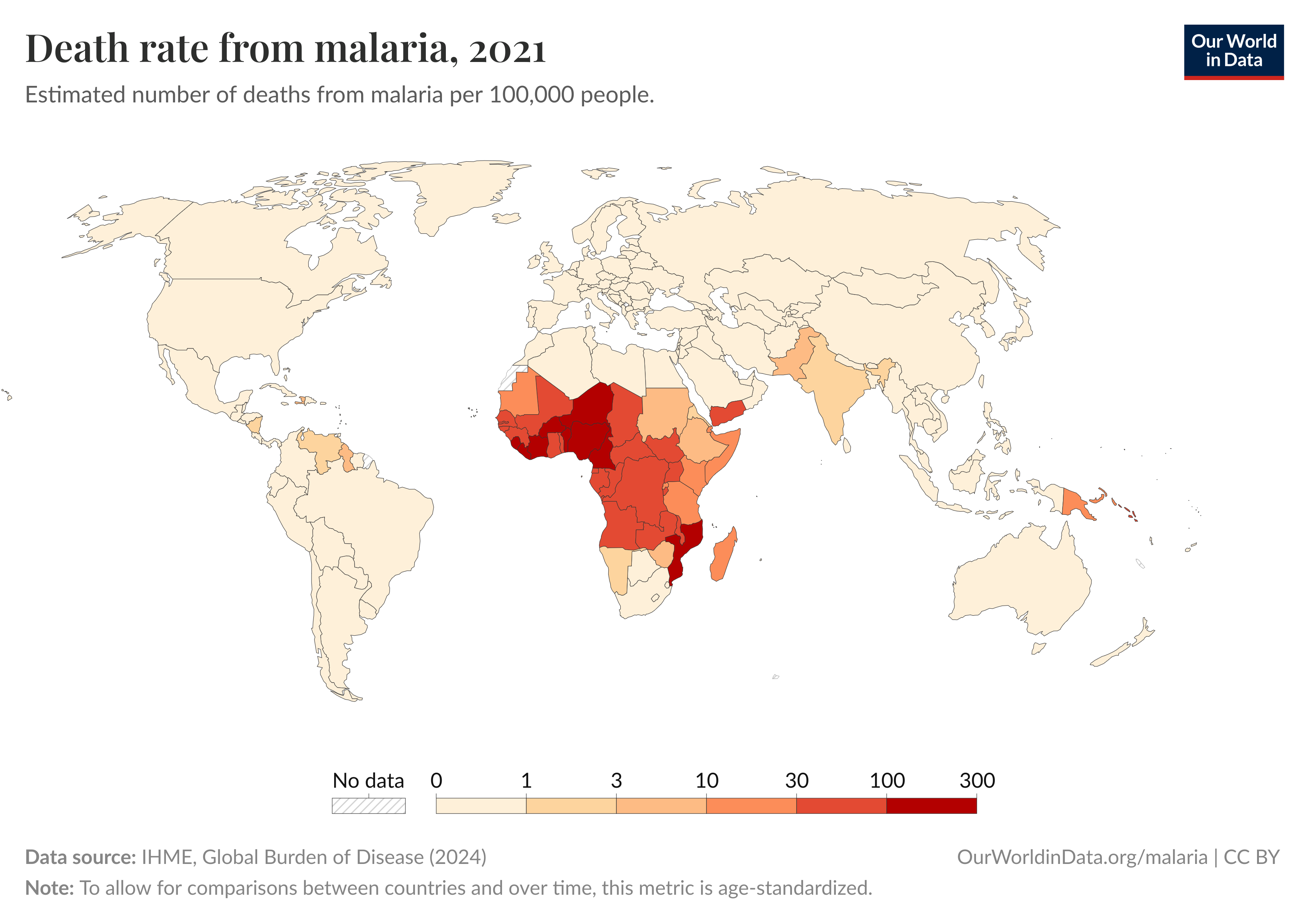
Estimated number of deaths from malaria per 100,000 people per country

Malaria, the mosquito-borne infectious disease caused by Plasmodium parasites, has been successfully eliminated or significantly reduced in many regions of the world, but remains widespread in others. Most of Europe, North America, Australia, North Africa and the Caribbean, along with parts of South America, Asia and Southern Africa, are now free from malaria, while much of the central part of Africa continues to experience high levels of transmission.

The World Health Organization (WHO) defines "elimination" (or "malaria-free") as having no domestic transmission (indigenous cases) for the past three years. They also define "pre-elimination" and "elimination" stages when a country has fewer than 5 or 1, respectively, cases per 1000 people at risk per year. In 2021, the total of international and national funding for malaria control and elimination was $3.5 billion—only half of what is estimated to be needed. According to UNICEF, to achieve the goal of a malaria-free world, annual funding would need to more than double to reach the US$6.8 billion target.

In parts of the world with rising living standards, the elimination of malaria was often a collateral benefit of the introduction of window screens and improved sanitation. A variety of usually simultaneous interventions represents best practice. These include antimalarial drugs to prevent or treat infection; improvements in public health infrastructure to diagnose, sequester and treat infected individuals; bednets and other methods intended to keep mosquitoes from biting humans; and vector control strategies such as larvaciding with insecticides, ecological controls such as draining mosquito breeding grounds or introducing fish to eat larvae and indoor residual spraying (IRS) with insecticides.

== Development of malaria control ==
=== Pre-modern epidemiology ===
Malaria has majorly affected humans since the Neolithic Revolution, approximately 10,000 years before the present. Ancient societies including the Egyptians and Greeks were affected by the disease, and by the 4th century BCE it was widely known as a killer in Greece, though its cause was not yet understood. Malaria was prevalent in the Roman Empire, and the Roman scholars associated the disease with the marshy or swampy lands where the disease was particularly rampant. It was from those Romans the name "malaria" originated. They called it malaria (literally meaning "bad air") as they believed that the disease was a kind of miasma that was spread in the air, as originally conceived by ancient Greeks. Since then, it was a medical consensus for centuries that malaria was spread due to miasma, the bad air.

Spanish missionaries in the 16th–19th-century Americas observed Amerindians near Loxa (Ecuador) treating fever with powder from "Peruvian bark" (later established to be from any of several trees of genus Cinchona). It was used by the Quechua Indians of Ecuador to reduce the shaking effects caused by severe chills. Jesuit Brother Agostino Salumbrino (1561–1642), who lived in Lima and was an apothecary by training, observed the Quechua using the bark of the cinchona tree for that purpose. While its effect in treating malaria (and hence malaria-induced shivering) was unrelated to its effect in controlling shivering from cold, it was nevertheless effective for malaria. The use of the "fever tree" bark was introduced into European medicine by Jesuit missionaries (Jesuit's bark). Jesuit Bernabé de Cobo (1582–1657), who explored Mexico and Peru, is credited with taking cinchona bark to Europe. He brought the bark from Lima to Spain, and then to Rome and other parts of Italy, in 1632. Francesco Torti wrote in 1712 that only "intermittent fever" was amenable to the fever tree bark. This work finally established the specific nature of cinchona bark and brought about its general use in medicine.

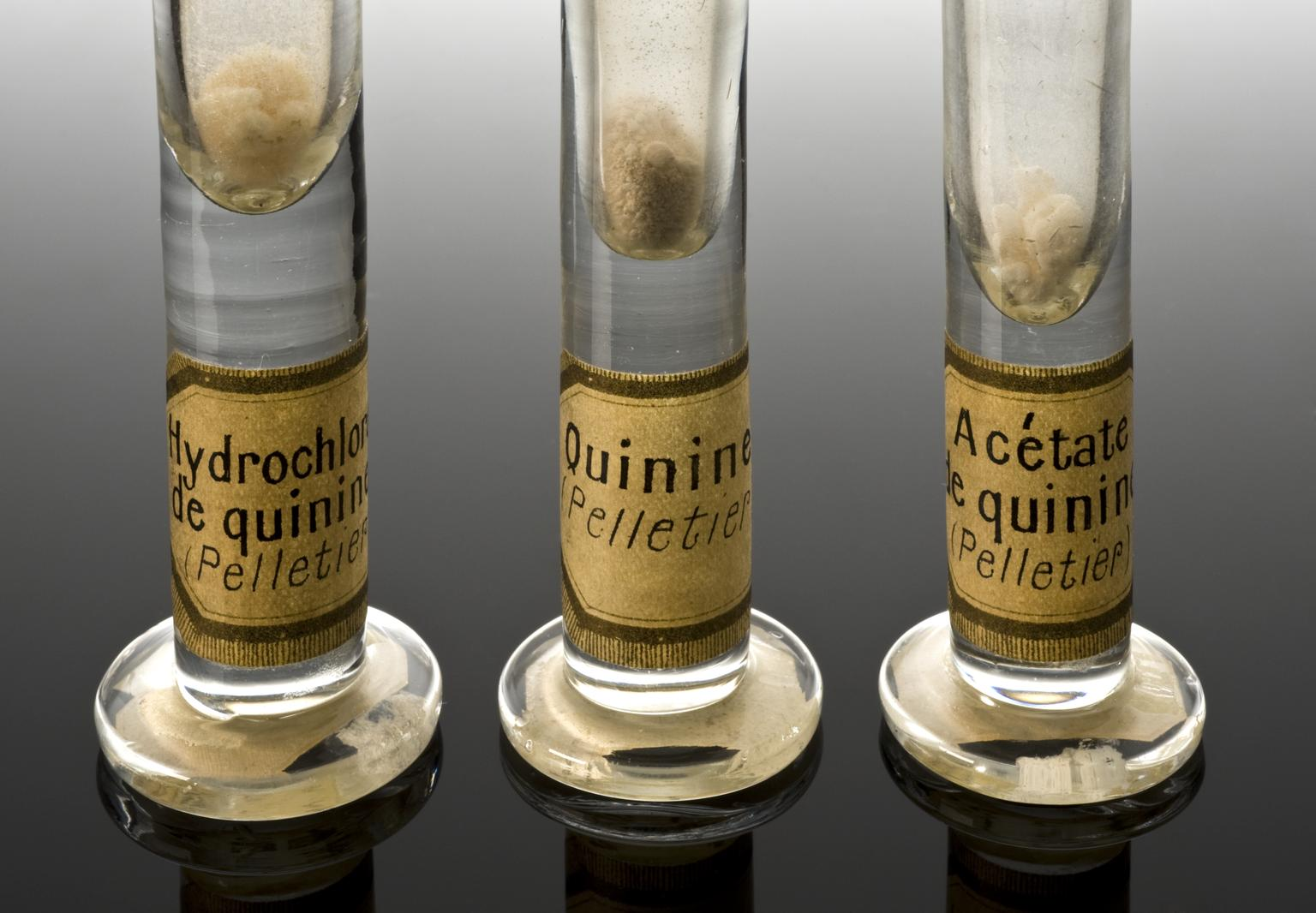
Original preparation of quinine acetate by Pelletier. circa 1820.

=== 19th–early 20th centuries ===
==== Quinine ====
In the 19th century, the first drugs were developed to treat malaria, and parasites were first identified as its source. French chemist Pierre Joseph Pelletier and French pharmacist Joseph Bienaimé Caventou separated in 1820 the alkaloids cinchonine and quinine from powdered fever tree bark, allowing for the creation of standardized doses of the active ingredients. Prior to 1820, the bark was simply dried, ground to a fine powder and mixed into a liquid (commonly wine) for drinking.

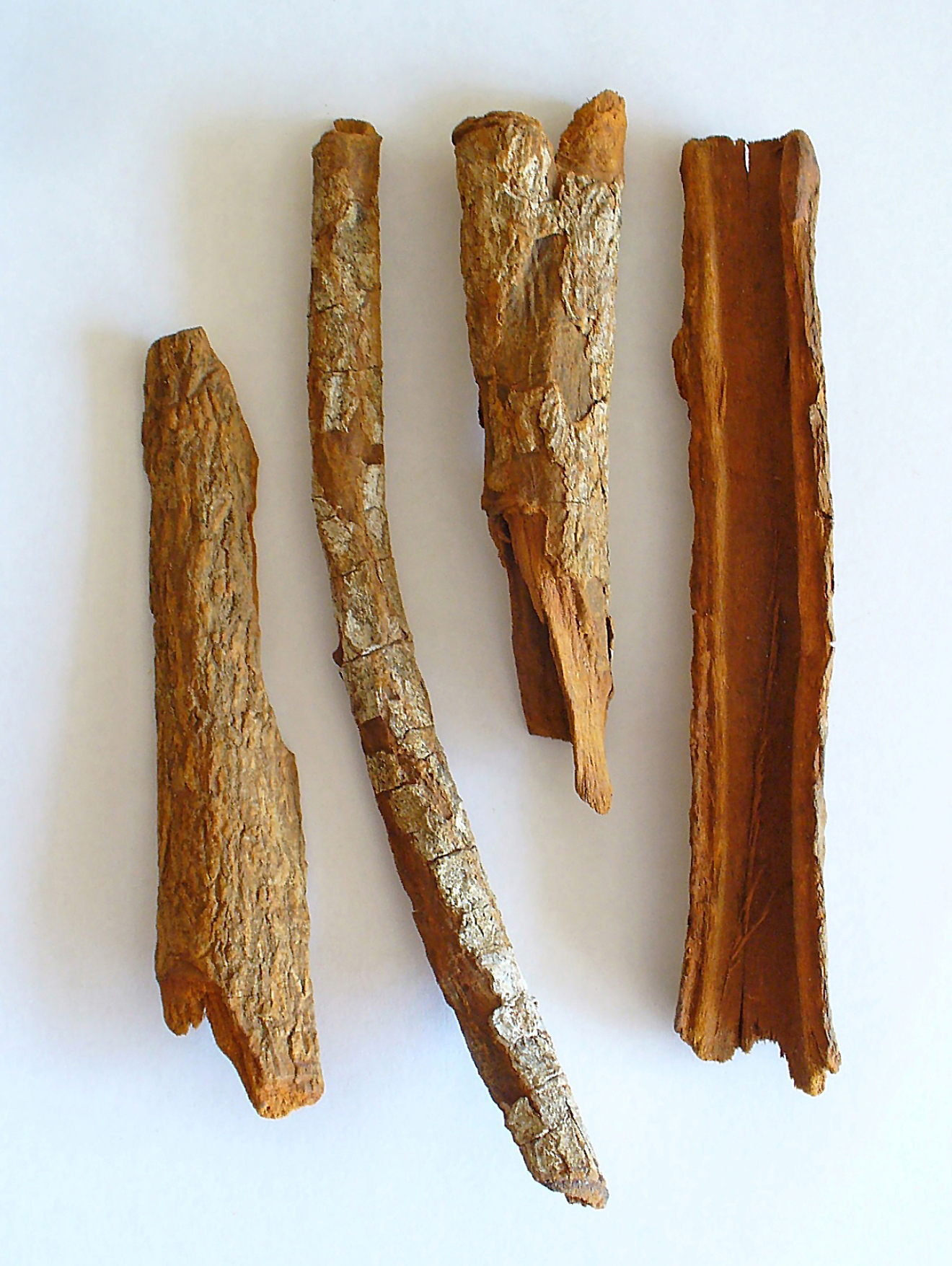
Bark of cinchona officinalis, an early treatment for malaria known as Peruvian bark

Native Bolivian Manuel Incra Mamani spent four years collecting cinchona seeds in the Andes in Bolivia, highly prized for their quinine but forbidden from export. He provided them to an English trader, Charles Ledger, who sent the seeds to his brother in England to sell. He sold them to the Dutch government, which cultivated 20,000 trees of the Cinchona ledgeriana in Java (Indonesia). By the end of the 19th century, the Dutch had established a world monopoly over its supply.

==== Isolation and identification of malarial parasites ====
In 1834, in British Guiana, a German physician, Carl Warburg, invented an antipyretic medicine: 'Warburg's Tincture'. This secret, proprietary remedy contained quinine and a number of herbs. Trials were held in Europe in the 1840s and 1850s. It was officially adopted by the Austrian Empire in 1847. It was considered by many eminent medical professionals to be a more efficacious antimalarial than quinine. It was also more economical. The British government supplied Warburg's Tincture to troops in India and other colonies.

In 1880, French physician Charles Louis Alphonse Laveran, working in the military hospital of Constantine, Algeria, observed pigmented parasites inside the red blood cells of people afflicted with malaria. He witnessed the release of flagellated microgametes from the parasites, and became convinced that the moving flagella were parasitic microorganisms. He noted that quinine removed the parasites from the blood. Laveran called this microscopic organism Oscillaria malariae and proposed that malaria was caused by this protozoan. This discovery remained controversial until the development of the oil immersion lens in 1884 and of superior staining methods in 1890–1891. Laveran was awarded the 1907 Nobel Prize for Physiology or Medicine "in recognition of his work on the role played by protozoa in causing diseases".

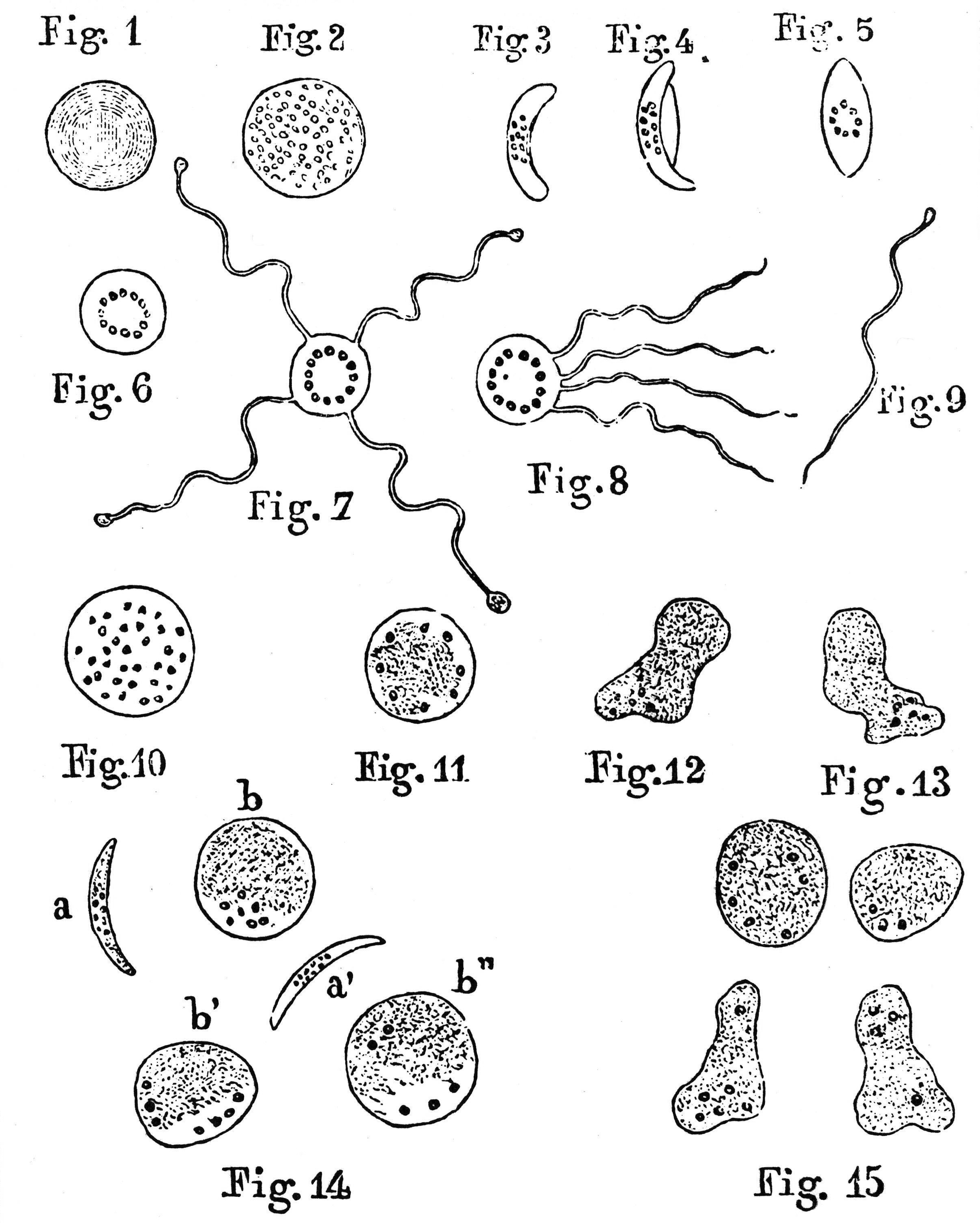
Laveran's drawing of pigmented parasites and the exflagellation of male gametocytes

==== Mosquito-malaria theory and early attempts at control ====
The notion of malaria as being caused by "bad air", or miasma, was accepted by medicine until the 19th century. The theory that the disease was in fact transmitted by mosquitoes was developed in the latter half of the century, at first received with controversy until it was proven correct in 1897.

In 1882, English-American physician Albert Freeman Africanus King proposed eradicating malaria from Washington, DC by encircling the city with a wire screen as high as the Washington Monument. Many people took this as a jest, partly because the link between malaria and mosquitoes had, at that time, been hypothesized by only a few physicians.

In 1896, an outbreak of malaria in Uxbridge, Massachusetts prompted health officer Dr. Leonard White to write a report to the State Board of Health, which led to a study of mosquito-malaria links and the first efforts for malaria prevention. Massachusetts state pathologist Theobald Smith asked that White's son collect mosquito specimens for further analysis, and that citizens add screens to windows and drain collections of water.

Britain's Sir Ronald Ross, an army surgeon working in Secunderabad, India, proved in 1897 that malaria is transmitted by mosquitoes, an event now commemorated by World Mosquito Day. He was able to find pigmented malaria parasites in a mosquito that he artificially fed on a malaria patient who had crescents in his blood. He continued his research into malaria by showing that certain mosquito species (Culex fatigans) transmit malaria to sparrows and he isolated malaria parasites from the salivary glands of mosquitoes that had fed on infected birds. He reported this to the British Medical Association in Edinburgh in 1898.

Ross' scientific evidences were soon fortified by Italian biologists including Giovanni Battista Grassi, Amico Bignami, and Giuseppe Bastianelli, who discovered that human malarial parasite was transmitted by the bite of a female mosquito. In 1899 they reported the infection of Plasmodium falciparum with the mosquito Anopheles claviger However the practical importance of validating the theory, i.e. control of mosquito vector should be an effective management strategy for malaria, was not realised by the medical community and the public. Hence in 1900 Patrick Manson clinically demonstrated that the bite of infected anopheline mosquitoes invariably resulted in malaria. He acquired carefully reared infected mosquitoes from Bignami and Bastianelli in Rome. Manson infected his own son, P. Thurburn Manson, with malaria, and P. Thurburn gave a detailed account of his malarial fevers and treatment at the London School of Tropical Medicine. As he summarised, Manson's clinical trial showed that the practical solution to malaria infection was to avoid areas where mosquitoes are abundant, to destroy the habitats of mosquitoes, and to protect from mosquito bites.

== Mosquito control ==
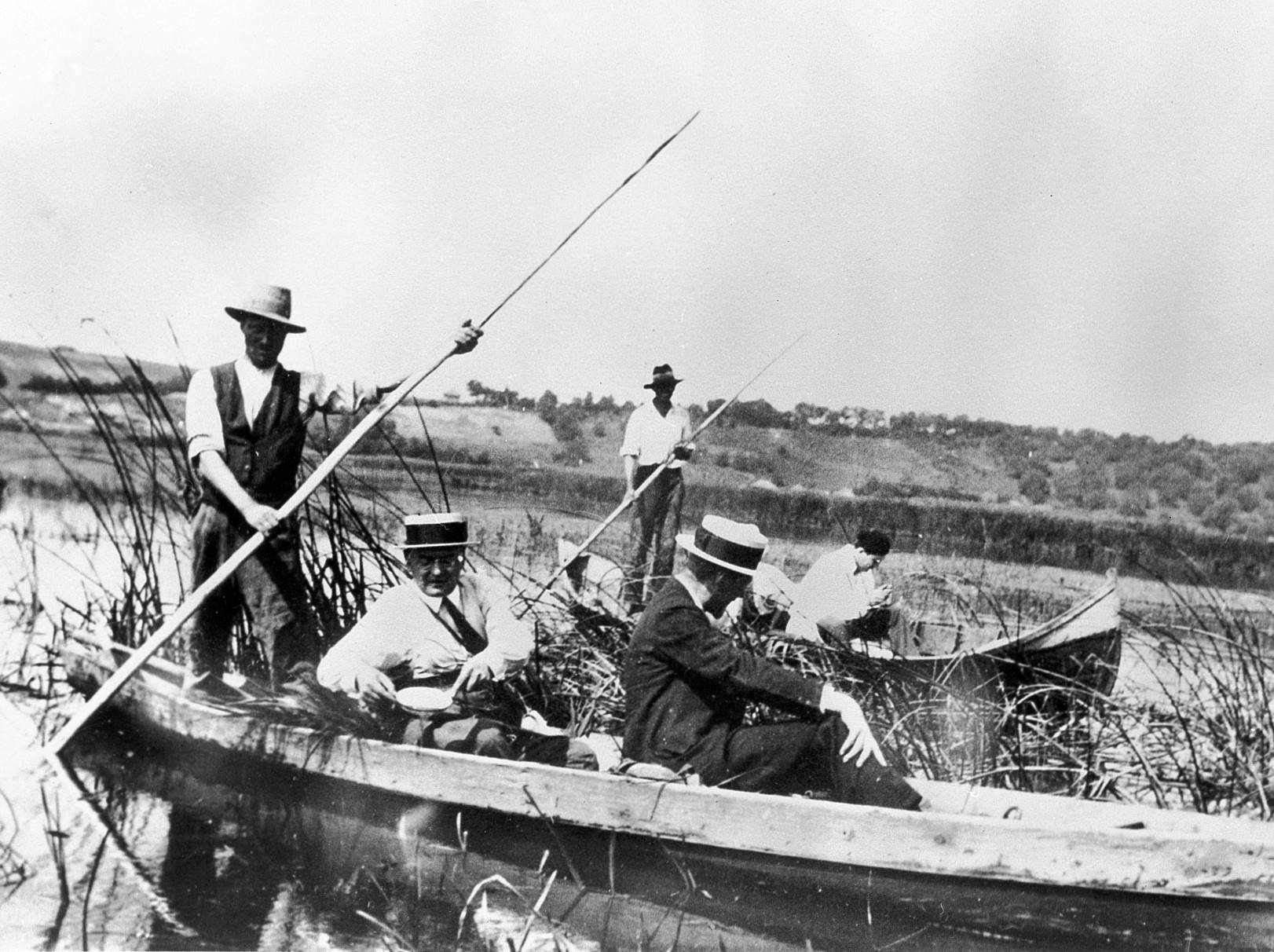
Members of the Malaria Commission of the League of Nations collecting larvae on the Danube Delta, 1929

In 1904, chief sanitation officer of the Panama Canal construction project Colonel William C. Gorgas fumigated buildings, sprayed insect-breeding sites, installed mosquito netting and window screens, and drained stagnant water to minimize the spread yellow fever and malaria at the project's construction sites following the proof of mosquito-malaria theory. Despite opposition from the project's commission (one member said his ideas were "barmy"), Gorgas persisted, and after two years of extensive work, the project's mosquito-spread disease problem was nearly eliminated.

In 1930, American entomologist Raymond Corbett Shannon discovered invasive disease-carrying African Anopheles gambiae mosquitoes living in Brazil (DNA analysis later revealed the actual species to be A. arabiensis). The introduction of this vector caused the greatest epidemic of malaria ever seen in the New World. However, complete eradication of A. gambiae from northeast Brazil and thus from the New World was achieved in 1940 by the systematic application of the arsenic-containing compound Paris green to breeding places, and of pyrethrum spray-killing to adult resting places.

Malaria was once common in the United States, but the US eliminated malaria from most parts of the country in the early 20th century using vector control programs, which combined the monitoring and treatment of infected humans, draining of wetland breeding grounds for agriculture and other changes in water management practices, and advances in sanitation, including greater use of glass windows and screens in dwellings. The National Malaria Eradication Program (1947–52) had reduced the incidence of malaria in the United States to the point that the program was officially ended.

=== Indoor residual spraying ===
The Austrian chemist Othmar Zeidler is credited with the first synthesis of DDT (Dichlorodiphenyltrichloroethane) in 1874. The insecticidal properties of DDT were identified in 1939 by chemist Paul Hermann Müller of Geigy Pharmaceutical. For his discovery of DDT as a contact poison against several arthropods, he was awarded the 1948 Nobel Prize in Physiology or Medicine.

Rockefeller Foundation studies showed in Mexico that DDT remained effective for six to eight weeks if sprayed on the inside walls and ceilings of houses and other buildings. The first anti-malarial field test in which residual DDT was applied to the interior surfaces of all habitations and outbuildings was carried out in central Italy in the spring of 1944. The objective was to determine the residual effect of the spray on anopheline density in the absence of other control measures. Spraying began in Castel Volturno and, after a few months, in the delta of the Tiber. The unprecedented effectiveness of the chemical was confirmed: the new insecticide was able to eradicate malaria by eradicating mosquitoes. At the end of World War II, a massive malaria control program based on DDT spraying was carried out in Italy. In Sardinia – the second largest island in the Mediterranean – between 1946 and 1951, the Rockefeller Foundation conducted a large-scale experiment to test the feasibility of the strategy of "species eradication" in an endemic malaria vector.

The concept of eradication prevailed in 1955 in the Eighth World Health Assembly: DDT was adopted as a primary tool in the fight against malaria. The U.S. Agency for International Development supports indoor DDT spraying as a vital component of malaria control programs and has initiated DDT and other insecticide spraying programs in tropical countries. As of 2006, the World Health Organization recommends 12 insecticides in IRS operations, including DDT and the pyrethroids cyfluthrin and deltamethrin. This public health use of small amounts of DDT is permitted under the Stockholm Convention, which prohibits its agricultural use. One problem with all forms of IRS is insecticide resistance. Mosquitoes affected by IRS tend to rest and live indoors, and due to the irritation caused by spraying, their descendants tend to rest and live outdoors, meaning that they are less affected by the IRS. Communities using insecticide treated nets, in addition to indoor residual spraying with 'non-pyrethroid-like' insecticides found associated reductions in malaria. Additionally, the use of 'pyrethroid-like' insecticides in addition to indoor residual spraying did not result in a detectable additional benefit in communities using insecticide treated nets.

=== Insecticidal nets ===
Mosquito nets treated with insecticides—known as insecticide-treated nets (ITNs) or bednets—were developed and tested in the 1980s for malaria prevention by P. Carnevale and his team in Bobo-Dioulasso, Burkina Faso. ITNs are estimated to be twice as effective as untreated nets, and offer greater than 70% protection compared with no net. These nets are dip-treated using a synthetic pyrethroid insecticide such as deltamethrin or permethrin which will double the protection over a non-treated net by killing and repelling mosquitoes. For maximum effectiveness, ITNs should be re-impregnated with insecticide every six months. This process poses a significant logistical problem in rural areas. Newer, long-lasting insecticidal nets (LLINs) have now replaced ITNs in most countries and dual agent nets, typically using alpha-cypermethrin and chlorfenapyr, are starting to be used in response to reports of mosquito resistance.

According to one study comparing methods to prevent malaria between 2000 and 2015 in sub-Saharan Africa, the combined methods prevented approximately six hundred sixty three million cases, and ITNs in particular prevented about sixty eight percent of those cases (around four hundred fifty one million). It is also one of the most cost-effective methods of prevention. These nets can often be obtained for around $2.50–$3.50 (2–3 euros) from the United Nations, the World Health Organization (WHO), and others. ITNs have been shown to be the most cost-effective prevention method against malaria and are part of WHO's Millennium Development Goals (MDGs). Generally LLINs are purchased by donor groups and delivered through in-country distribution networks.

ITNs protect people sleeping under them and simultaneously kill mosquitoes that contact the nets. Some protection is provided to others by this method, including people sleeping in the same room but not under the net. However, mathematical modeling has suggested that disease transmission may be exacerbated after bed nets have lost their insecticidal properties under certain circumstances. Although ITN users are still protected by the physical barrier of the netting, non-users could experience an increased bite rate as mosquitoes are deflected away from the non-lethal bed net users. The modeling suggests that this could increase transmission when the human population density is high or at lower human densities when mosquitoes are more adept at locating their blood meals.

In December 2019 it was reported that West African populations of Anopheles gambiae include mutants with higher levels of sensory appendage protein 2 (a type of chemosensory protein in the legs), which binds to pyrethroids, sequestering them and so preventing them from functioning, thus making the mosquitoes with this mutation more likely to survive contact with bednets.

A review of 22 randomized controlled trials of ITNs found (for Plasmodium falciparum malaria) that ITNs can reduce deaths in children by one fifth and episodes of malaria by half.

More specifically, in areas of stable malaria "ITNs reduced the incidence of uncomplicated malarial episodes by 50% compared to no nets, and 39% compared to untreated nets" and in areas of unstable malaria "by 62% compared to no nets and 43% compared to untreated nets". As such the review calculated that for every 1000 children protected by ITNs, 5.5 lives would be saved each year.

Through the years 1999 and 2010 the abundance of female anopheles gambiae densities in houses throughout western Kenya were recorded. This data set was paired with the spatial data of bed net usage in order to determine correlation. Results showed that from 2008 to 2010 the relative population density of the female anopheles gambiae decreased from 90.6% to 60.7%. The conclusion of this study showed that as the number of houses which used insecticide treated bed nets increased the population density of female anopheles gambiae decreased. This result did however vary from region to region based on the local environment.

A 2019 study in PLoS ONE found that a campaign to distribute mosquito bednets in the Democratic Republic of Congo led to a 41% decline mortality for children under five who lived in areas with a high malaria risk.

==== Distribution ====
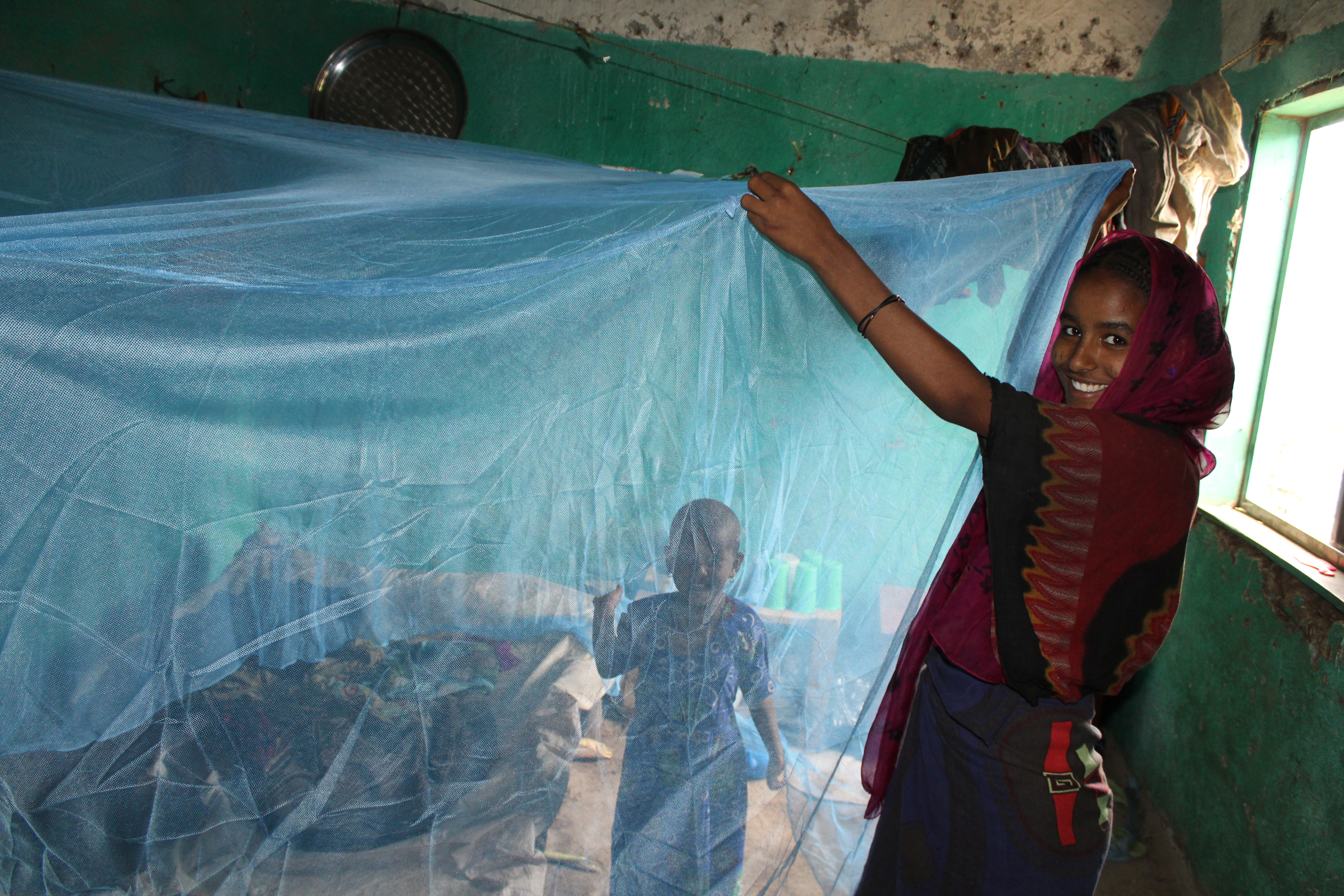
An Ethiopian mother with a mosquito net treated with a long-lasting insecticide.

While some experts argue that international organizations should distribute ITNs and LLINs to people for free to maximize coverage (since such a policy would reduce price barriers), others insist that cost-sharing between the international organization and recipients would lead to greater use of the net (arguing that people will value a good more if they pay for it). Additionally, proponents of cost-sharing argue that such a policy ensures that nets are efficiently allocated to the people who most need them (or are most vulnerable to infection). Through a "selection effect", they argue, the people who most need the bed nets will choose to purchase them, while those less in need will opt out.

However, a randomized controlled trial study of ITNs uptake among pregnant women in Kenya, conducted by economists Pascaline Dupas and Jessica Cohen, found that cost-sharing does not necessarily increase the usage intensity of ITNs nor does it induce uptake by those most vulnerable to infection, as compared to a policy of free distribution. In some cases, cost-sharing can decrease demand for mosquito nets by erecting a price barrier. Dupas and Cohen's findings support the argument that free distribution of ITNs can be more effective than cost-sharing in increasing coverage and saving lives. In a cost-effectiveness analysis, Dupas and Cohen note that "cost-sharing is at best marginally more cost-effective than free distribution, but free distribution leads to many more lives saved."

The researchers base their conclusions about the cost-effectiveness of free distribution on the proven spillover benefits of increased ITN usage. ITNs protect the individuals or households that use them, and they protect people in the surrounding community in one of two ways.

- First, ITNs kill adult mosquitoes infected with the malaria parasite directly which increases their mortality rate and can therefore decrease the frequency in which a person in the community is bitten by an infected mosquito.
- Second, certain malaria parasites require days to develop in the salivary glands of the vector mosquito. This process can be accelerated or decelerated via weather; more specifically heat. Plasmodium falciparum, for example, the parasite that is responsible for the majority of deaths in Sub-Saharan Africa, takes 8 days to mature. Therefore, malaria transmission to humans does not take place until approximately the 10th day, although it requires blood meals at intervals of 2 to 5 days. By killing mosquitoes before maturation of the malaria parasite, ITNs can reduce the number of encounters of infected mosquitoes with humans.

When a large number of nets are distributed in one residential area, their chemical additives help reduce the number of mosquitoes in the environment. With fewer mosquitoes, the chances of malaria infection for recipients and non-recipients are significantly reduced. (In other words, the importance of the physical barrier effect of ITNs decreases relative to the positive externality effect of the nets in creating a mosquito-free environment when ITNs are highly concentrated in one residential cluster or community.)

Standard ITNs must be replaced or re-treated with insecticide after six washes and, therefore, are not seen as a convenient, effective long-term solution to the malaria problem.

As a result, the mosquito netting and pesticide industries developed so-called long-lasting insecticidal mosquito nets, which also use pyrethroid insecticides. There are three types of LLINs — polyester netting which has insecticide bound to the external surface of the netting fibre using a resin; polyethylene which has insecticide incorporated into the fibre and polypropylene which has insecticide incorporated into the fibre. All types can be washed at least 20 times, but physical durability will vary. A survey carried out in Tanzania concluded that effective life of polyester nets was 2 to 3 years; with polyethylene LLINs there are data to support over 5 years of life with trials in showing nets which were still effective after 7 years.

=== Housing modifications ===
Housing is a risk factor for malaria and modifying the house as a prevention measure may be a sustainable strategy that does not rely on the effectiveness of insecticides such as pyrethroids. The physical environment inside and outside the home that may improve the density of mosquitoes are considerations. Examples of potential modifications include how close the home is to mosquito breeding sites, drainage and water supply near the home, availability of mosquito resting sites (vegetation around the home), the proximity to live stock and domestic animals, and physical improvements or modifications to the design of the home to prevent mosquitoes from entering, such as window screens.

In addition to installing window screens, house screening measures include screening ceilings, doors, and eaves. In 2021, the World Health Organization's (WHO) Guideline Development Group conditionally recommended screening houses in this manner to reduce malaria transmission. However, the WHO does point out that there are local considerations that need to be addressed when incorporating these techniques. These considerations include the delivery method, maintenance, house design, feasibility, resource needs, and scalability.

Several studies have suggested that screening houses can have a significant effect on malaria transmission. Beyond the protective barrier screening provides, it also does not call for daily behavioral changes in the household. Screening eaves can also have a community-level protective effect, ultimately reducing mosquito-biting densities in neighboring houses that do not have this intervention in place.

In some cases, studies have used insecticide-treated (e.g., transfluthrin) or untreated netting to deter mosquito entry. One widely used intervention is the In2Care BV EaveTube. In 2021, In2Care BV received funding from the United States Agency for International Development to develop a ventilation tube that would be installed in housing walls. When mosquitoes approach households, the goal is for them to encounter these EaveTubes instead. Inside these EaveTubes is insecticide-treated netting that is lethal to insecticide-resistant mosquitoes. This approach to mosquito control is called the Lethal House Lure method. The WHO is currently evaluating the efficacy of this product for widespread use.

=== Mass drug administration ===
Mass drug administration (MDA) involves the administration of drugs to the entire population of an area regardless of disease status. A subtype, known as seasonal malaria chemoproprophylaxis (or chemoprevention) involves giving those vulnerable to complications from malaria (such as young children under 5, or pregnant women) medications to prevent malaria. This may be done during certain seasons, where mosquitos are more likely to spread the disease. Malaria vaccination, when combined with seasonal chemoprevention has been shown to prevent more cases of malaria compared to vaccination alone.

A 2021 Cochrane review on the use of community administration of ivermectin found that, to date, low quality evidence shows no significant effect on reducing incidence of malaria transmission from the community administration of ivermectin.

=== Mosquito-targeted drug delivery ===
One potential way to reduce the burden of malaria is to target the infection in mosquitoes, before it enters the mammalian host (during sporogeny). Drugs may be used for this purpose which have unacceptable toxicity profiles in humans. For example, aminoquinoline derivates show toxicity in humans, but this has not been shown in mosquitoes. Primaquine is particularly effective against Plasmodium gametocytes. Likewise, pyrroloquinazolinediamines show unacceptable toxicity in mammals, but it is unknown whether this is the case in mosquitoes. Pyronaridine, thiostrepton, and pyrimethamine have been shown to dramatically reduce ookinete formation in P. berghei, while artefenomel, NPC-1161B, and tert-butyl isoquine reduce exflagellation in P. Falciparum.

=== Other mosquito control methods ===
People have tried a number of other methods to reduce mosquito bites and slow the spread of malaria. Efforts to decrease mosquito larvae by decreasing the availability of open water where they develop, or by adding substances to decrease their development, are effective in some locations. Electronic mosquito repellent devices, which make very high-frequency sounds that are supposed to keep female mosquitoes away, have no supporting evidence of effectiveness. There is a low certainty evidence that fogging may have an effect on malaria transmission. Larviciding by hand delivery of chemical or microbial insecticides into water bodies containing low larval distribution may reduce malarial transmission. There is insufficient evidence to determine whether larvivorous fish can decrease mosquito density and transmission in the area.

== History of global eradication efforts ==
=== WHO programs (1953–1969) ===
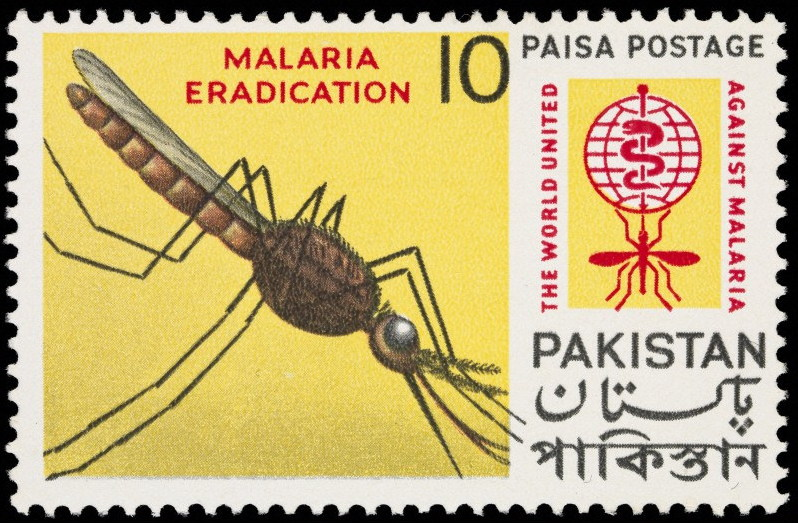
1962 Pakistani postage stamp promoting malaria eradication program

In 1953, the World Health Organization (WHO) launched an antimalarial program in parts of Liberia as a pilot project to determine the feasibility of malaria eradication in tropical Africa. However, these projects encountered difficulties that foreshadowed the general retreat from malaria eradication efforts across tropical Africa by the mid-1960s.

In 1955 the WHO launched the Global Malaria Eradication Program (GMEP). The program relied largely on DDT for mosquito control and rapid diagnosis and treatment to break the transmission cycle. The program eliminated the disease in "North America, Europe, the former Soviet Union", and in "Taiwan, much of the Caribbean, the Balkans, parts of northern Africa, the northern region of Australia, and a large swath of the South Pacific" and dramatically reduced mortality in Sri Lanka and India.

However, failure to sustain the program, increasing mosquito tolerance to DDT, and increasing parasite tolerance led to a resurgence. In many areas early successes partially or completely reversed, and in some cases rates of transmission increased. Experts tie malarial resurgence to multiple factors, including poor leadership, management and funding of malaria control programs; poverty; civil unrest; and increased irrigation. The evolution of resistance to first-generation drugs (e.g. chloroquine) and to insecticides exacerbated the situation. The program succeeded in eliminating malaria only in areas with "high socio-economic status, well-organized healthcare systems, and relatively less intensive or seasonal malaria transmission".

For example, in Sri Lanka, the program reduced cases from about one million per year before spraying to just 18 in 1963 and 29 in 1964. Thereafter the program was halted to save money and malaria rebounded to 600,000 cases in 1968 and the first quarter of 1969. The country resumed DDT vector control but the mosquitoes had evolved resistance in the interim, presumably because of continued agricultural use. The program switched to malathion, but despite initial successes, malaria continued its resurgence into the 1980s. Sri Lanka eventually achieved malaria-free status in 2016.

Due to vector and parasite resistance and other factors, the feasibility of eradicating malaria with the strategy used at the time and resources available led to waning support for the program. WHO suspended the program in 1969 and attention instead focused on controlling and treating the disease. Spraying programs (especially using DDT) were curtailed due to concerns over safety and environmental effects, as well as problems in administrative, managerial and financial implementation. Efforts shifted from spraying to the use of bednets impregnated with insecticides and other interventions.

=== 21st century ===
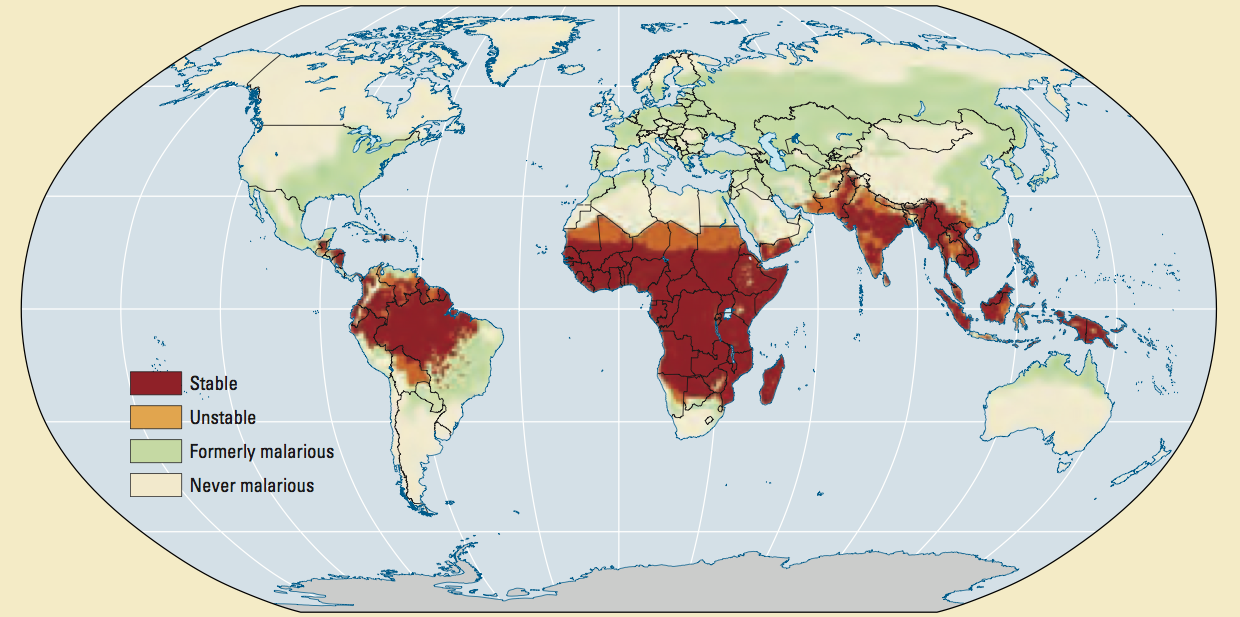
Malaria prevalence, as of 2009

In the 21st century, several organizations launched initiatives to control or eradicate malaria. In 2000, the United Nations included malaria control among the key health objectives of the Millennium Development Goals. Target 6C aimed to reverse the global increase in malaria incidence by 2015, with specific targets for children under five years old. One of the targets of Goal 3 of the UN's 2015 Sustainable Development Goals was to end the malaria epidemic in all countries by 2030.

Video recording of a set of presentations given in 2010 about humanity's efforts towards malaria eradication

Since 2002, The Global Fund to Fight AIDS, Tuberculosis, and Malaria has distributed insecticide-treated nets to prevent mosquito-borne transmission, tested and treated malaria cases, and provided preventive care, reaching hundreds of millions of people. In 2006, the organization Malaria No More set a public goal of eliminating malaria from Africa by 2015, and the organization claimed they planned to dissolve if that goal was accomplished. As of 2025, the organization was still active. In 2007, World Malaria Day was established by the 60th session of the World Health Assembly, and as of 2025, it continues to be observed annually.

In 2008, the U.S.-based Clinton Foundation worked to manage demand and stabilize prices in the artemisinin market, and has since supported other programs aimed at combating malaria. Other efforts, such as the Malaria Atlas Project, focused on analysing climate and weather information required to accurately predict malaria spread based on the availability of habitat of malaria-carrying parasites. The Malaria Policy Advisory Committee (MPAC) of the World Health Organization (WHO) was formed in 2012, "to provide strategic advice and technical input to WHO on all aspects of malaria control and elimination".

In 2015 the WHO targeted a 90% reduction in malaria deaths by 2030, and Bill Gates said in 2016 that he thought global eradication would be possible by 2040. According to the WHO's World Malaria Report 2015, the global mortality rate for malaria fell by 60% between 2000 and 2015. The WHO targeted a further 90% reduction between 2015 and 2030, with a 40% reduction and eradication in 10 countries by 2020. However, the 2020 goal was missed with a slight increase in cases compared to 2015. Additionally, UNICEF reported that the number of malaria deaths for all ages increased by 10% between 2019 and 2020, in part due to service disruptions related to the COVID-19 pandemic, before experiencing a minor decline in 2021.

Before 2016, the Global Fund against HIV/AIDS, Tuberculosis and Malaria had provided 659 million ITN (insecticide treated bed nets), organise support and education to prevents malaria. The challenges are high due to the lack of funds, the fragile health structure and the remote indigenous population that could be hard to reach and educate. Most of indigenous population rely on self-diagnosis, self-treatment, healer, and traditional medicine. The WHO applied for fund to the Gates Foundation which favour the action of malaria eradication in 2007. Six countries, the United Arab Emirates, Morocco, Armenia, Turkmenistan, Kyrgyzstan, and Sri Lanka managed to have no endemic cases of malaria for three consecutive years and certified malaria-free by the WHO despite the stagnation of the funding in 2010. The funding is essential to finance the cost of medication and hospitalisation cannot be supported by the poor countries where the disease is widely spread. The goal of eradication has not been met; nevertheless, the decrease rate of the disease is considerable.

While 31 out of 92 endemic countries were estimated to be on track with the WHO goals for 2020, 15 countries reported an increase of 40% or more between 2015 and 2020. Between 2000 and 30 June 2021, twelve countries were certified by the WHO as being malaria-free. Argentina and Algeria were declared free of malaria in 2019. El Salvador and China were declared malaria-free in the first half of 2021.

Regional disparities were evident: Southeast Asia was on track to meet WHO's 2020 goals, while Africa, Americas, Eastern Mediterranean and West Pacific regions were off-track. The six Greater Mekong Subregion countries aim for elimination of P. falciparum transmitted malaria by 2025 and elimination of all malaria by 2030, having achieved a 97% and 90% reduction of cases respectively since 2000. Ahead of World Malaria Day, 25 April 2021, WHO named 25 countries in which it is working to eliminate malaria by 2025 as part of its E-2025 initiative.

A major challenge to malaria elimination is the persistence of malaria in border regions, making international cooperation crucial.

In 2018, WHO announced that Paraguay was free of malaria, after a national malaria eradication effort that began in 1950.

In March 2023, the WHO certified Azerbaijan and Tajikistan as malaria-free, and Belize in June 2023. Cabo Verde was certified in January 2024, bringing the total number of countries and territories certified malaria-free to 44. In October 2024, the WHO certified Egypt to be malaria-free.

Since 2000, support for malaria eradication increased, although some actors in the global health community (including voices within the WHO) view malaria eradication as a premature goal and suggest that the establishment of strict deadlines for malaria eradication may be counterproductive as they are likely to be missed.

==== Potential eradication of malaria by year 2050 ====
Experts say that malaria could be eliminated as wild disease of humans by the year 2050. World class experts (41 of them) in fields such as malariology, biomedicine, economics and health policy advocated more funding, a central data repository for dealing with local outbreaks of malaria, and training the workers needed to carry out the plan. Details are published in The Lancet. The report refers to current knowledge, recent research and financial matters to describe a respectable plan.

The number of countries in which malaria was endemic was reduced from 200 to 86 in the years from 1900 to 2017. A further reduction by another 20 countries occurred by 2020. In light of the indication of possible practical accomplishment, countries and regions are planning further progress. Through the use of optimal diagnostic techniques, effective treatment and vector reduction the world should be nearly free of malaria by 2050. This will require technical improvements in organizational efficiency and more money.

== National malaria elimination ==
As of July 2025, the WHO has certified 47 countries and territories as having eliminated malaria within their boundaries, and lists another 60 "countries where malaria never existed or disappeared without specific measures" on a supplemental list. Malaria-free countries are defined by the WHO as those "that have achieved at least 3 consecutive years of zero indigenous cases".

== See also ==
- Malaria in Mandatory Palestine, anti-malaria campaign
