= De Lugo =

De Lugo (of Lugo) may refer to: j m

== People with the surname de Lugo ==
- Álvaro Yáñez de Lugo, Spanish nobleman
- Francisco de Lugo (conquistador) (d. 1532), Spanish conquistador, son of Álvaro
- Alonso Fernández de Lugo (d. 1525), Spanish conquistador, great-nephew of Álvaro
- Pedro Fernández de Lugo (1475–1536), Spanish nobleman, son of Alonso
- Francisco Bahamonde de Lugo (d. 1574), Governor of Puerto Rico and Cartagena
- Francisco de Lugo (1580–1652) Spanish Jesuit, theologician
- John de Lugo (1583–1660), Spanish Jesuit, cardinal, brother of Francisco
- Bernardo de Lugo, Spanish linguist, friar and writer from Nueva Granada
- Carlos Benites Franquis de Lugo (b. 1691), Spanish Governor of Texas
- Ron de Lugo (b. 1930), American politician

== Dukes of Lugo ==
- Infanta Elena, Duchess of Lugo (b. 1963), daughter of Juan Carlos I of Spain
- Jaime de Marichalar, Duke of Lugo (b. 1963), former husband of Infanta Elena

== Places ==
- Tulantepec de Lugo Guerrero, Hidalgo, Mexico

== See also ==
- Lugo (surname)
