= Lugo (surname) =

Lugo is a Spanish surname named after the city of Lugo in Galicia, Spain.

== People with the surname de Lugo ==
These are patrilineal descendants of the original House of Lugo, a noble family in Lugo.

- Álvaro Yáñez de Lugo, Spanish nobleman
- Francisco de Lugo (conquistador) (d. 1532), Spanish conquistador, son of Álvaro
- Alonso Fernández de Lugo (d. 1525), Spanish conquistador, great-nephew of Álvaro
- Pedro Fernández de Lugo (1475–1536), Spanish nobleman, son of Alonso
- Francisco Bahamonde de Lugo (d. 1574), Governor of Puerto Rico and Cartagena
- Francisco de Lugo (1580–1652) Spanish Jesuit, theologician
- John de Lugo (1583–1660), Spanish Jesuit, cardinal, brother of Francisco
- Bernardo de Lugo, Spanish linguist, friar and writer from Nueva Granada
- Carlos Benites Franquis de Lugo (1691–?), Spanish Governor of Texas
- Ron de Lugo (1930–2020), American politician

== People with the surname Lugo ==
The shortened form Lugo is likely a branch of the original de Lugo lineage, as in similar cases (e.g. Peña and de la Peña).

- Alfonso Lugo (born 1978), Mexican singer, musician, broadcaster and record producer
- Amador Lugo Guadarrama (1921–2002), Mexican artist
- Cecilia Lugo (born 1955), Mexican dancer and choreographer
- Fernando Lugo (born 1951), former president of Paraguay
- José del Carmen Lugo (1831–c.1870), Southern California landowner
- José Inocente Lugo (1871–1963), Mexican lawyer
- Joswa Lugo (born 2007), Dominican baseball player.
- Julio Lugo (1975–2021), Dominican baseball shortstop, brother of Ruddy
- Matthew Lugo (born 2001), Puerto Rican baseball player
- Pablo Lugo (born 1932), Puerto Rican boxer
- Richard Lugo (born 1973), Venezuelan basketball player
- Roberto Lugo (born 1981), American potter and social activist
- Ruddy Lugo (born 1980), Dominican baseball pitcher, brother of Julio
- Seth Lugo (born 1989), American baseball player
