= Lugo (disambiguation) =

Lugo is a city in Galicia, Spain.

Lugo may also refer to:

== Places ==
=== Spain ===
- Lugo (province), a province in Galicia, Spain
- Lugo (comarca), a comarca in the province of Lugo, Galicia, Spain
- Lugo (Congress of Deputies constituency), represents the province of Lugo in the Spanish congress
- Lugo (Senate constituency), represents the province of Lugo in the Spanish senate
- Lugo (Parliament of Galicia constituency), represents the province of Lugo in the Galician parliament

=== Italy ===
- Lugo, Emilia-Romagna, a town and comune in the province of Ravenna, Emilia-Romagna, Italy
- Lugo di Vicenza, a town and comune in the province of Vicenza, Veneto, Italy
- Lugo di Valpantena, frazione of the comune of Grezzana in Veneto, Italy

=== Elsewhere ===
- Lugo-di-Nazza, a commune in the Haute-Corse department on the island of Corsica, France.
- Lugo, California, a hamlet in the U.S State of California

== People ==
- Lugo (surname), includes a list of notable people surnamed Lugo or de Lugo

== Other ==
- CD Lugo, football team in the Spanish city

== See also ==
- De Lugo (disambiguation)
