= Schedula Romana =

- Author: Pietro Paolo Puccerini
- Language: Italian
- Subject: Medicine
- Publication date: 1649
- Publication place: Italy

The Schedula Romana was a pharmaceutical handbill published in 1649. Generally assumed to have been designed after the knowledge of the cinchona bark properties brought from South America by Spanish Jesuit Juan de Lugo, the Schedula Romana is considered to be an early example of an efficient antimalarial recipe. The Schedula gives instructions on proper dosages and application of the cinchona bark. The doses recommended are likely to have been established by trial and error, and they are assumed to be relied on results obtained using the various recipes proposed by Roman apothecaries.

== See also ==
- History of malaria
- Timeline of malaria
- Jesuit's bark
- Therapeutice Specialis
