= Sebastiano Bado =

Genoese physician (fl. 1643 - 1676)

Sebastiano Bado, sometimes Latinized as Sebastianus Baldus (also spelled Badi or Baldo; fl. 1643 - 1676), was a Genoese physician notable for his medicinal usage of cinchona bark in the 17th century.

Bado studied medicine in Rome and became the court doctor to John de Lugo. He wrote extensively on the use of cinchona bark powder to dispel malaria, notably in his 1663 publication Anastasis corticis Peruviae, seu Chinae Chinae defensio, Sebastiani Badi Genuensis [...] Contra Ventilationes Ioannis Iacobi Chifletii, gemitusque Vopisci Fortunati Plempii. The traditional story connecting cinchona with malaria treatment was first recorded in this publication. Bado tells of the wife of Luis Jerónimo de Cabrera, 4th Count of Chinchón and Viceroy of Peru, who fell ill in Lima with a tertian fever. A Spanish governor advised a traditional remedy using cinchona bark, which resulted in a miraculous and rapid cure. The Countess then supposedly ordered a large quantity of the bark and took it back to Europe. Bado's story has been generally rejected as little more than a legend. However, it is because of this story that Linnaeus chose the genus name Cinchona.

Bado distributed cinchona bark powder at local hospitals under the direction of de Lugo. By the end of his career, Bado had become head of two city hospitals in Genoa. He was last mentioned as being alive, albeit suffering from podagra, in 1676.
