= Dactylispa manterii =

Scientific classification
- Kingdom: Animalia
- Phylum: Arthropoda
- Class: Insecta
- Order: Coleoptera
- Suborder: Polyphaga
- Infraorder: Cucujiformia
- Family: Chrysomelidae
- Genus: Dactylispa
- Species: D. manterii

Binomial name
- Dactylispa manterii (Gestro, 1897)

Synonyms
- Hispa manterii Gestro, 1897

Species of beetle

Dactylispa manterii is a species of beetle of the family Chrysomelidae. It is found in Indonesia (Sumatra) and Malaysia.

== Life history ==
The recorded host plants for this species are Cocos nucifera, Cinchona ledgeriana, Curcuma, Cinchona, and Lagerstroemia species.
