= Jesuit's bark =

Former malaria remedy

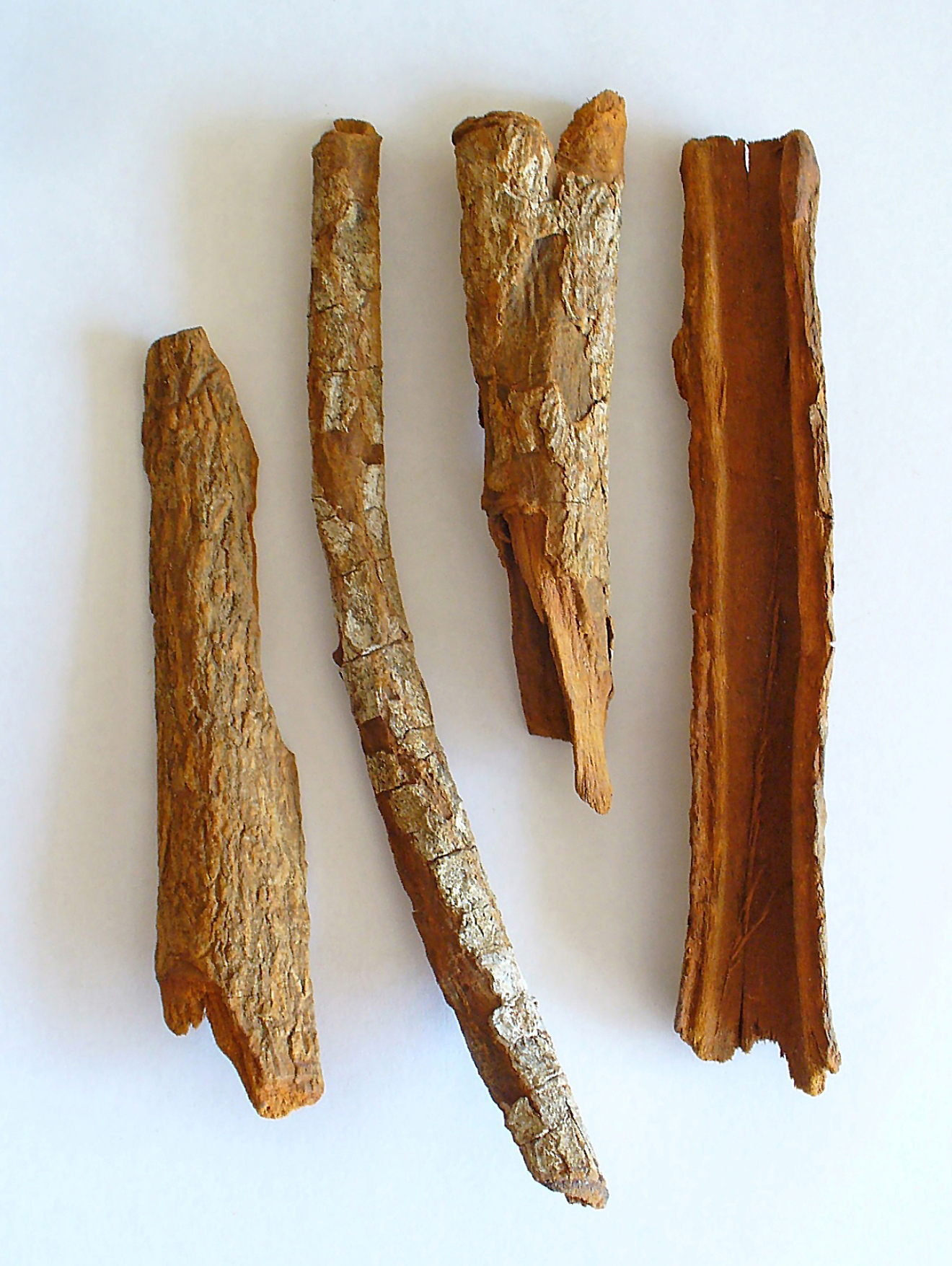
Cinchona bark

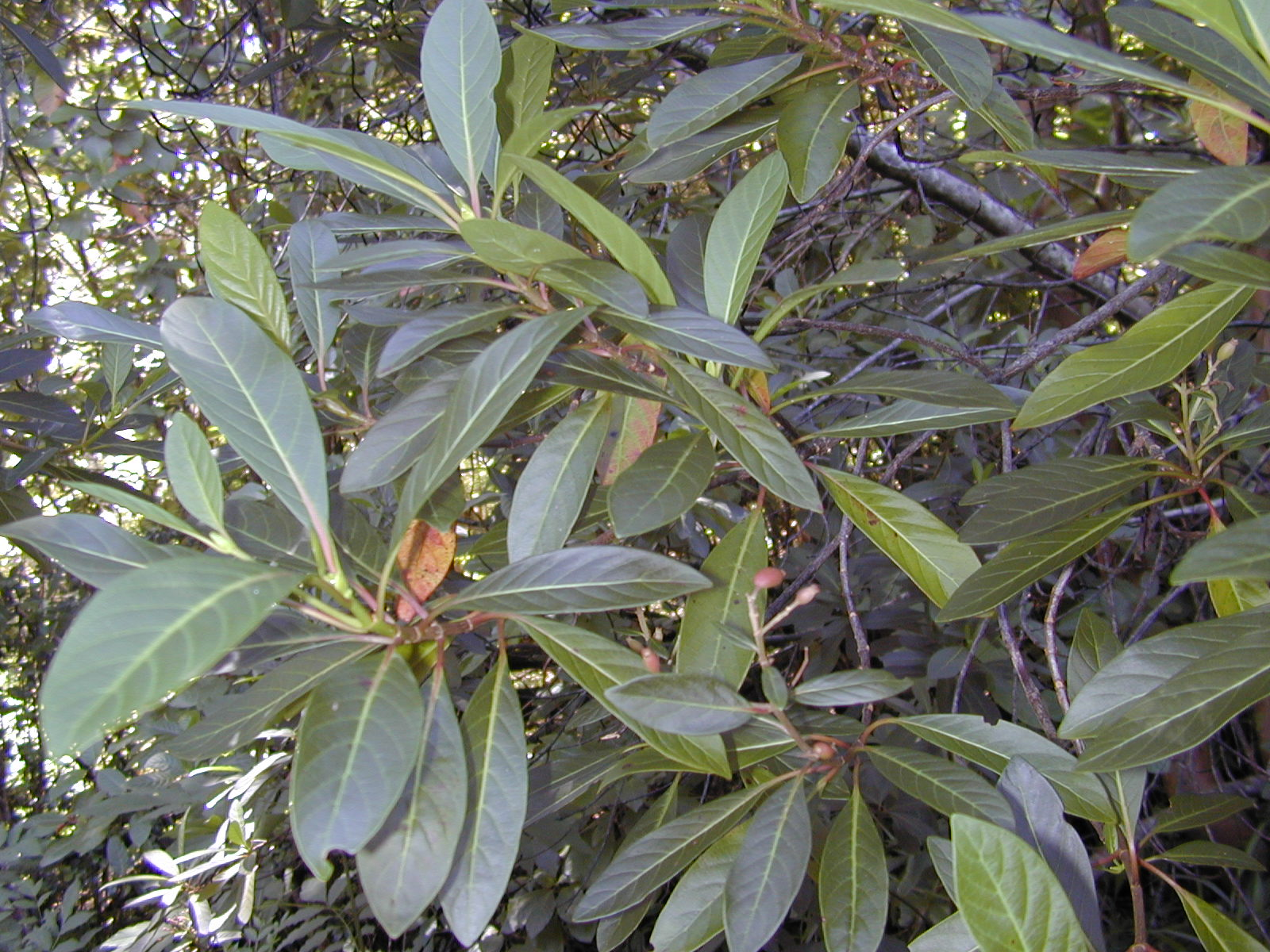
Cinchona tree

Jesuit's bark, also known as cinchona bark, Peruvian bark or China bark, is a former remedy for malaria, as the bark contains quinine, used to treat the disease. The bark of several species of the genus Cinchona, family Rubiaceae indigenous to the western Andes of South America, was introduced to Jesuit missionaries during the 17th century as a traditional treatment for malaria by indigenous people in Peru.

== History ==
The postcolonial history of cinchona bark dates back more than 350 years. Circa 1650, the physician Sebastiano Bado declared that this bark had proved more precious to mankind than all the gold and silver that the Spaniards had obtained from South America. In the 18th century, the Italian professor of medicine Bernardino Ramazzini said that the introduction of Peruvian bark would be of the same importance to medicine that the discovery of gunpowder was to the art of war, an opinion endorsed by contemporary writers on the history of medicine. The value of Jesuit's bark, and the controversy surrounding it, were both recognized by Benjamin Franklin, who wittily commented upon it in his Poor Richard's Almanack for October 1749, telling the story of Robert Talbot's use of it to cure the French Dauphin. Hugh Algernon Weddell observed, "Few subjects in natural history have excited general interest in a higher degree than cinchona; none perhaps have hitherto merited the attention of a greater number of distinguished men". Dissension, however, was rife at the time, mainly due to its source of discovery, the Jesuits. Alexander von Humboldt said, "It almost goes without saying that among Protestant physicians hatred of the Jesuits and religious intolerance lie at the bottom of the long conflict over the good or harm effected by Peruvian Bark".

Sebastiano Bado's book on the Chinchona

The Spanish Jesuit missionaries in Peru were taught the healing power of the bark by natives, between 1620 and 1630, when a Jesuit at Loxa was indebted to its use for his cure from an attack of malaria (Loxa Bark). It was used at the recommendation of the Jesuits in 1630, when the Countess of Chinchon (Cinchon; the derivative is Cinchona, the appellation selected by Carl Linnaeus in 1742; Clements Markham preferred "Chinchona"), wife of the new viceroy, who had just arrived from Europe, was taken ill with malaria at Lima. The countess was saved from death, and in thanksgiving caused large quantities of the bark to be collected. This she distributed to malaria sufferers, partly in person and partly through the Jesuits of St. Paul's College at Lima (pulvis comitissæ). She returned to Europe in 1640 and was the first to bring the bark there to spread its use through Spain and the rest of the continent, as stated by Markham. The Jesuit Barnabé de Cobo, in his capacity as procurator of the Peruvian province of his order, is credited with first bringing the bark from Lima to Spain, and afterwards to Rome and other parts of Italy, in 1632. In the meanwhile its merits must have been ascertained both in Lima and in various parts of Europe, as Count Chinchon and his physician Juan de Vega brought it back with them in 1640.

Count Chinchon, however, troubled himself little about the use or sale of the bark. A greater distribution resulted from the large quantity brought over by the Jesuit Bartolomé Tafur, who, like Cobo, came to Spain in 1643 while procurator of the Peruvian province of his order, proceeded through France (there is an alleged cure of the young Louis XIV, when still dauphin, effected by Father Tafur by means of Peruvian bark), and thence to Italy as far as Rome.

Jesuit theologian John de Lugo learned about the cinchona from Tafur in 1643, and became an outspoken advocate for it throughout Europe, earning him the nickname pulvis cardinalis. The pope's physician, Gabriel da Fonseca, analyzed the bark at de Lugo's request, reported on it favorably, and supported its distribution among the sick in Rome.

Among those who came to support the drug through de Lugo's influence was Pietro Paolo Pucciarini, a lay brother and apothecary in the Jesuit College at Rome. Pucciarini was instrumental in the drug's distribution, and published the Schedula Romana giving directions for its use as early as 1651.

In his friend Honoré Fabri, a French Jesuit, who stayed for a time in Rome, de Lugo won a determined defender of the bark against the first anticinchona pamphlet written by the Brussels doctor Jean-Jacques Chifflet. Under the pseudonym of Antimus Conygius, Fabri wrote in 1655 the first paper on cinchona published in Italy, as well as the first of the long list of brochures defending its use and the only independent article on this bark which has been issued by a Jesuit. The two Genoese, Girolamo Bardi, a priest, and Sebastiano Baldo, a physician, who were among the pioneer advocates of the plant, were intimate with the cardinal, and Baldo prefixed to his principal work a letter from de Lugo, dated 1659, on cinchona, which shows that the cardinal even when seventy-seven years old was still active in its behalf.

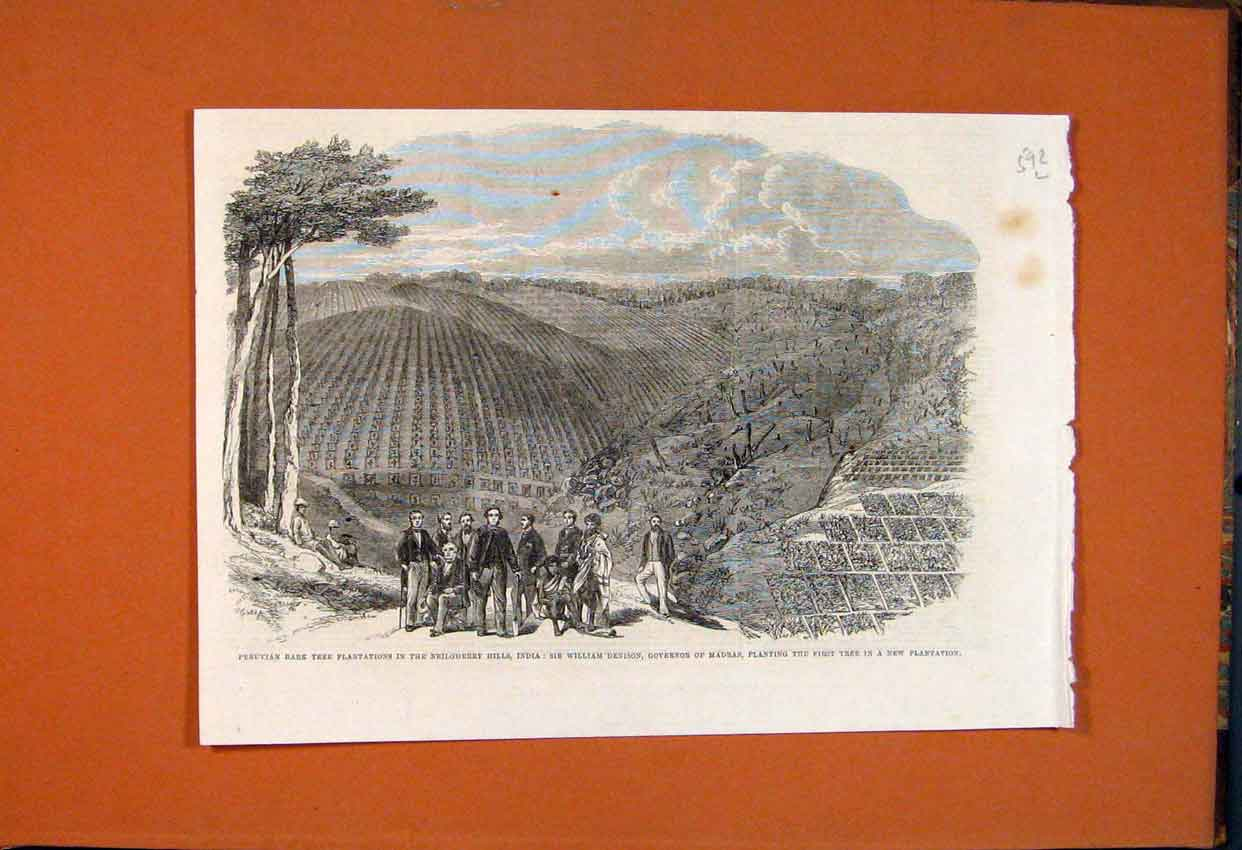
Peruvian bark plantation in India 1864

Circumstances created a suitable opportunity for disseminating the bark from Rome throughout Europe by means of the Jesuits. In 1646, 1650, and 1652 the delegates to the eighth, ninth, and tenth general councils of the order (three from each province) returned to their homes, taking it with them, and at the same time there is evidence of its use in the Jesuit colleges at Genoa, Lyon, Leuven, Ratisbon, etc. The remedy – connected with the name of Jesuit – very soon reached England. The English weekly Mercurius Politicus in 1658 contained in four numbers the announcement that: "The excellent powder known by the name of 'Jesuit's powder' may be obtained from several London chemists". It remains to recall the fact that even in the 17th and 18th centuries the bark kept in the Jesuit pharmacies or in their colleges was considered particularly efficacious because they were better able to provide a genuine unadulterated supply. Further, that in those two centuries Jesuit missionaries took the remedy to the malaria regions of foreign countries, even reaching the courts of Peking, China and Kyoto, Japan, where they cured the emperor by its means; that in Peru during the 18th century they urged American collectors to lay out new plantations; and in the 19th century they were the first to plant cinchona outside of South America.

== See also ==
- History of malaria
- Luis Jerónimo de Cabrera, 4th Count of Chinchón
- Schedula Romana
- Therapeutice Specialis
- Juan de Lugo
