= Manuel Incra Mamani =

Bolivian Incan bark and seed hunter

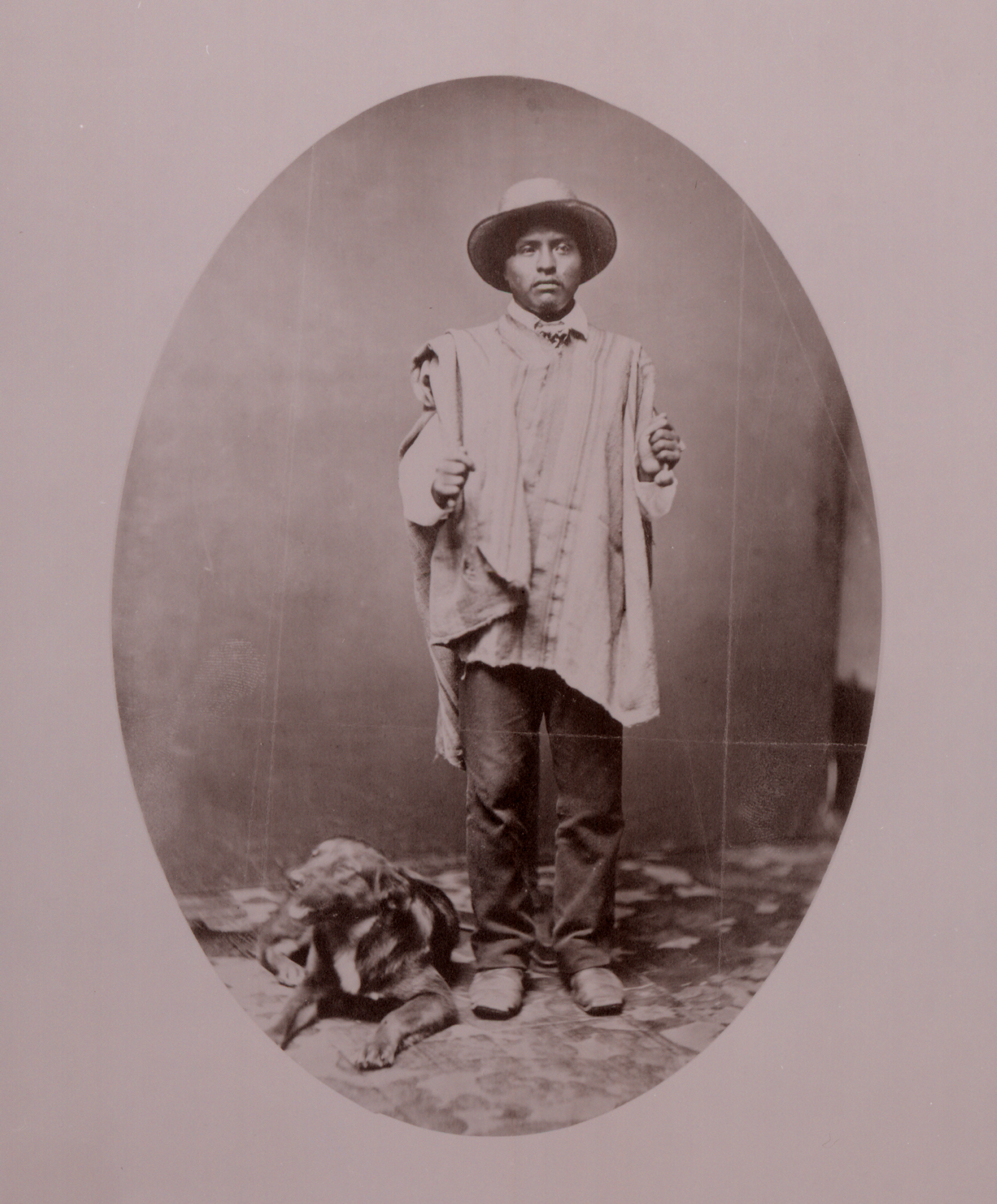
Black and white photograph of Santiago, the son of Manuel Incra Mamari.

Manuel Incra Mamani (? – 1871) was a Bolivian cascarillero (bark and seed hunter) from Coroico. He may have been of either Quechua and/or Aymara descent. Mamani found a cinchona tree species (Cinchona ledgeriana syn. C. calisaya) that had a higher proportion of quinine than most others. This species went into Dutch commercial cultivation, providing most of the world's quinine well into the 20th century.

== Life and work ==
Mamani was an experienced bark and seed collector, and had worked for Charles Ledger since 1843. He was able to identify at least 29 different sorts of cinchona trees. Ledger had noted Mamani's knowledge in a letter where he recorded asking him for his opinion on finding good quality cinchona trees in the area they were staying. Mamani responded "No Señor, the trees here about do not see the snow-capped mountains".

Mamani waited through four years of unsuitable weather (frosts destroyed the seeds from the high-quinine plants), and gave offerings to mountain spirits, in order to obtain a sample of seed from the high-quinine cinchona in 1865. The seeds that Mamani provided were sent to Ledger's brother, George, who then sold them to the Dutch government, who then cultivated plants in Java. Local people disapproved of Mamani helping Ledger.

The plant from which Mamani collected seed was later named Cinchona ledgeriana (syn C. calisaya) after Charles Ledger. Mamani is noted only as a "native" in some accounts of its finding and cultivation.

One researcher has suggested that 'Incra Mamani', as spelled by Charles Ledger in his letters, may be an Anglicization of 'Icamanahí'.

== Death ==
In 1871, whilst on a seed-collecting trip, Mamani was arrested, imprisoned and beaten. Some have suggested that this was likely because of his providing seeds to foreigners. Others suggest it was because he refused to identify his employer. He subsequently died of his injuries.
