= Luis Jerónimo de Cabrera, 4th Count of Chinchón =

Viceroy of Peru

Luis Jeronimo de Cabrera Count of Chinchón
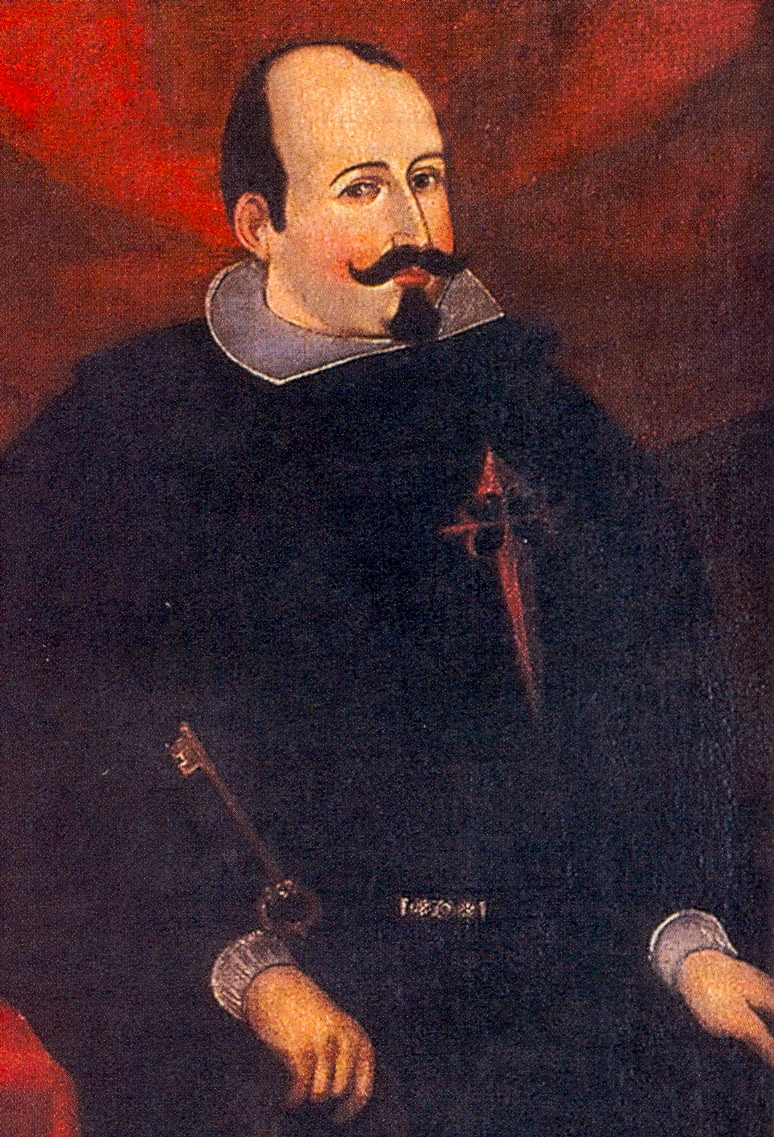

14th Viceroy of Peru
- In office January 14, 1629 – December 18, 1639
- Monarch: Philip IV
- Preceded by: Diego Fernández de Córdoba
- Succeeded by: Pedro de Toledo

Personal details
- Born: 1589 Madrid
- Died: 28 October 1647 (aged 57–58) Madrid

Luis Jerónimo Fernández de Cabrera Bobadilla Cerda y Mendoza, 4th Count of Chinchón, also known as Luis Xerónimo Fernandes de Cabrera Bobadilla y Mendoza, (1589 in Madrid – October 28, 1647 in Madrid) was a Spanish nobleman, Comendador of Criptana, Alcaide of the Alcázar de Segovia, Treasurer of Aragón, and captain general and Viceroy of Peru, from January 14, 1629, to December 18, 1639. His wife, Ana de Osorio (1599–1625), is credited as being one of the first Europeans to be treated with quinine, and as the person who introduced that medicine into Europe.

== Birth ==
Fernández de Cabrera Bobadilla was born in Madrid in 1589 (or perhaps 1590), into a family close to the Spanish throne. His parents were Diego Fernández de Cabrera, third Count of Chinchón and Inés Pacheco, the daughter of the marquis of Villena and 3rd Duke of Escalona, Diego López Pacheco, and Luisa Bernarda de Cabrera Bobadilla, third marquesa of Moya. Don Luis's parents were first cousins.

He was keeper of the Alcázar of Segovia in 1613. During his visit to Spain known as the "Spanish match", Prince Charles of England visited Segovia, after dining at Valsain. Chinchón showed the Prince the Galley Room or "second great hall" with the heraldry of Catherine of Lancaster. At the mint in Segovia, Chinchón had coins minted and gave them to Charles. In the evening there was a torchlit masque involving 32 mounted knights. Prince Charles gave the Count of Chinchón a jewel, and rewarded the poet Don Juan de Torres for his verses and Andrés de Almansa y Mendoza, who wrote an account of the events. The Prince left early in the morning for Santa María la Real de Nieva.

== Viceroy of Peru ==
He became viceroy of Peru in 1629. During his government, he suppressed an insurrection of the Uru and Araucano Indians. He also sent out the third expedition to explore the Amazon River, under Cristóbal de Acuña. (It was part of the return leg of the expedition of Pedro Teixeira.) He expanded the colonial navy and fortified the port of Callao.

Among his other official acts were the prohibition of direct trade between Peru and New Spain (Mexico) and the persecution of Portuguese Jews, the principal traders in Lima.

He also founded two chairs of medicine in the University of San Marcos.

== Quinine ==
In an account published in 1663 by Sebastiano Bado, an Italian, the following claim was made: In 1638, the Countess of Chinchon became severely ill with tertian fever (malaria). Juan López de Canizares, governor of Loxa, wrote the viceroy, explaining that he had recently been cured by the bark of the quinaquina tree, and recommending the same remedy to the vicereine. The governor was summoned to Lima, the medicine was administered, and the countess was cured. In 1639, according to Bado, the countess returned to Spain, bringing a large quantity of the bark with her. This was the first introduction of quinine into Europe.

However, the official diary of Viceroy Fernández de Cabrera was discovered in 1930. This diary contradicts many of the claims made by Bado. It states that Ana de Osorio, his first countess of Chinchón, died in Spain at least three years before her husband was named viceroy of Peru. It was his second countess, Francisca Henríquez de Ribera, who accompanied the Count to South America, where she enjoyed excellent health. The count himself had several episodes of fever, but was never treated with bark. The second countess never returned to Spain; she died in the port of Cartagena, Colombia during the return voyage.

In light of these much later revelations, Bado's account is now discredited among historians. Jesuit Barnabé de Cobo (1582–1657), who explored Mexico and Peru, is now credited with taking cinchona bark to Europe. He brought the bark from Lima to Spain, and afterwards to Rome and other parts of Italy, in 1632.

Carl Linnaeus called the genus of quinine-producing trees Cinchona in honor of the countess.

See also Jesuit's bark.

== Return to Spain ==
At the conclusion of his term as viceroy in 1639, Fernández de Cabrera returned to Spain, where he became a counselor of state and accompanied King Philip IV of Spain on campaign in Navarre, Aragon and Valencia. He died in 1647 in Madrid.

Government offices
Preceded by The Marquis of Guadalcázar	Viceroy of Peru; 1629–1639	Succeeded by The Marquis of Mancera
Spanish nobility
Preceded by Diego Fernández de Cabrera	Count of Chinchón; 1623–1647	Succeeded by Francisco Fernández de Cabrera
