= Alfonso Lugo =

Mexican musician

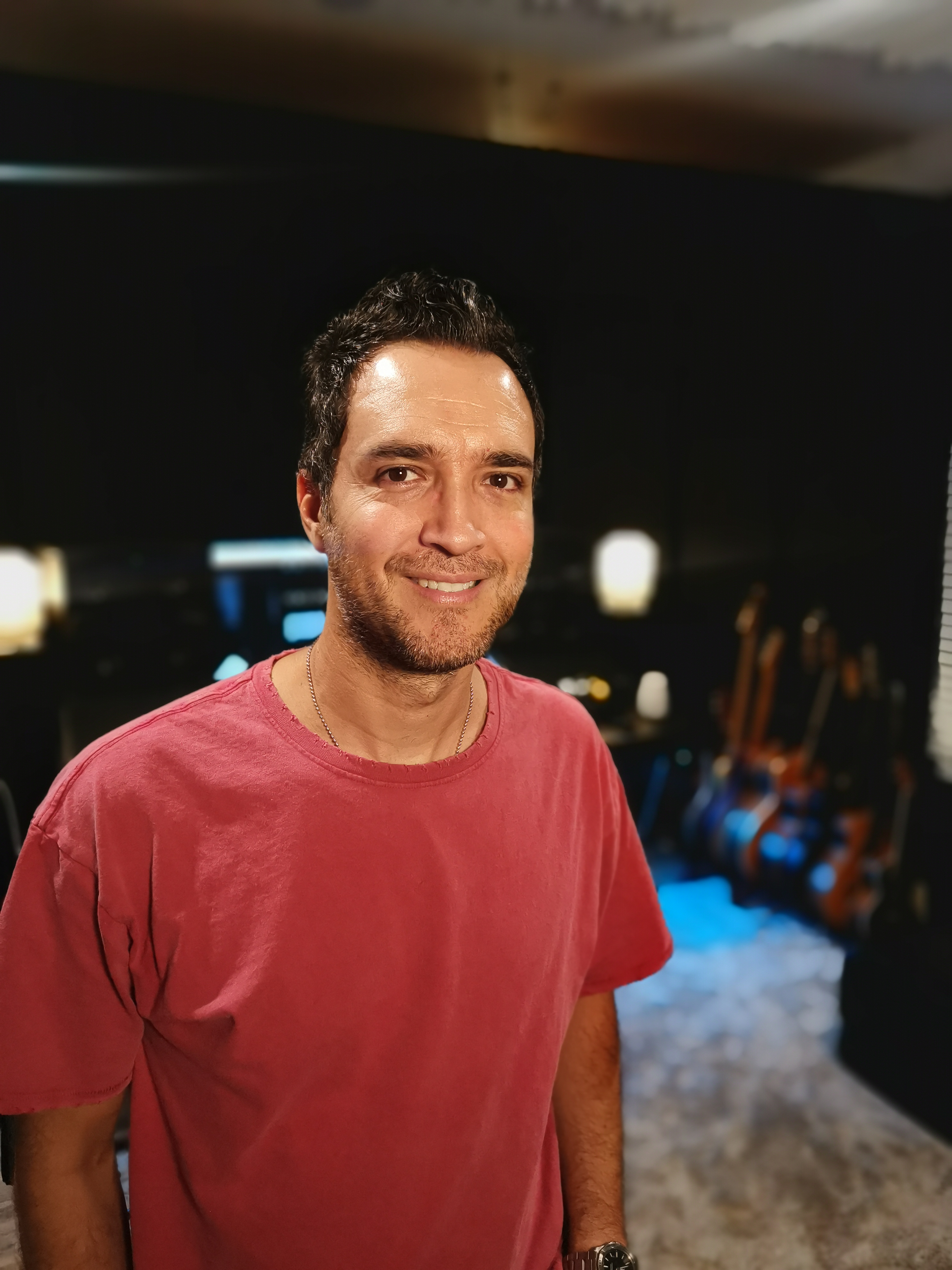
- Alfonso Lugo Portrait

Background information
- Born: September 16, 1978; Morelia, Mexico
- Genres: Latin pop
- Occupation(s): Singer, musician, record producer, broadcaster and composer
- Instrument(s): Voice, guitar
- Years active: 1995–present

Alfonso Lugo Orozco (born in Morelia, Michoacán on September 16, 1978) is a Mexican singer, musician, record producer, broadcaster and composer. During his career he has won several awards for his work as a broadcaster and producer, including the Bronze Lion at the Cannes Lions International Festival of Creativity, the Gold Medal at the Círculo Creativo Awards and the Grand Prize at the Sovas Voice Arts Awards, in which he has also received 14 nominations.

== Biography ==
=== Early life and education ===
Lugo was born in Morelia in 1978. From a very early age he became interested in music, learning to play the guitar as a child. He began his career in radio in the mid-1990s, producing several programs in his hometown while attending university. He later moved to São Paulo, Brazil to study marketing. Later, he studied music production in the United States and in his native country.

=== Career ===
==== As producer and broadcaster ====
After performing as a singer and musician in the bands Azul Profundo and Dislexia in the 1990s, in the mid-2000s he became professionally involved with Televisa Radio and in 2007 produced La hora nacional with Susana Moscatel, a weekly radio program sponsored by the Government of Mexico with cultural content. That same year he produced and served as audio engineer in the short film Las cartas de Jimena by filmmaker Armond Cohen.

Between 2008 and 2015 he was linked to Durazno 64 Audio, a Mexican music production company that worked with brands such as Levi Strauss & Co, McAfee, Garnier, Nestlé, Telmex and PepsiCo. In 2012 he founded Pulpo Escafandra, a company in charge of producing audiovisual content in video, CGI and animation. Three years later he became a founding partner of the music production studio Pulp Music Co, with which he has produced campaigns for companies such as MetroPCS and AT&T.

He has worked as a music producer in commercials for television, film and radio, and has been the institutional voice for various companies such as Burger King, Mercedes-Benz, Banamex, Instituto Tecnológico de Monterrey, Mexican Red Cross and Bacardí. He has also participated as a voice coach in various international events.

==== Musical career ====
Before settling in the United States, Lugo released the studio albums Homónimo (2003), Sol naciente (2005), En cámara lenta (2008), Sometimes (All I Want is You) (2009) and Beautiful Soul (2012). In the United States he resumed his musical career publishing in 2017 the single "Dame más".

In January 2019 he presented the song "Gravedad", a duet with actress and singer Regina Blandón for the film Mirreyes vs. Godínez. In August of the same year he released the single "Loca", co-produced by Mario Marchetti, recognized for his work with Demi Lovato and Jennifer Lopez. In May 2020 he released an EP titled Íntimo, and in December he presented the single "Stamina" with American singer Jasmine Crowe.

In February 2021 he released a new song, titled "Chocolate".

== Awards ==
- Grand Prize at Sovas Voice Arts for Best Spanish Voiceover, 2020.
- Bronze Lion at the Cannes Lions International Festival of Creativity.
- Gold and bronze medal at the Círculo Creativo Awards.
- Grand Prize at the El Ojo de Iberoamérica Festival.

== Discography ==
=== Studio albums ===
- Homónimo (2003)
- Sol naciente (2005)
- En cámara lenta (2008)
- Sometimes (All I Want is You) (2009)
- Beautiful Soul (2012)
- Íntimo (2020, EP)

=== Sencillos ===
Año	Sencillo	Notas
2017	"Dame más"	
2018	"Cae en la tentación"	
2018	"Don't Buy me Roses"	Ft. Goldi
2018	"Gravedad"	
2019	"Bésame"	
2019	"Yo te sigo"	Ft. Morach
2019	"Aunque me digas que no"	Ft. Jasmine Crown
2019	"Playita, playita"	
2019	"Loca"	
2020	"Stamina"	Ft. Jasmine Crown
2021	"Chocolate"	
2021	"Hot AF"	Ft. E. Twiss
2021	"Latinas"	Ft. Vince Miranda
