= Malaria Policy Advisory Committee =

The Malaria Policy Advisory Group (MPAG) – previously known as Malaria Policy Advisory Committee (MPAC) was established in 2011 to provide independent advice to World Health Organization on all policy areas relating to malaria control and elimination. The group convenes twice annually and is composed of some of the world's foremost experts on malaria. MPAG guided the development of the Global Technical Strategy for Malaria 2016–2030 and has provided strategic advice to WHO's Global Malaria Programme on a range of technical issues. The group is supported by a Guidelines Development Group and ad hoc Evidence Review Groups.
