= Charles Ledger =

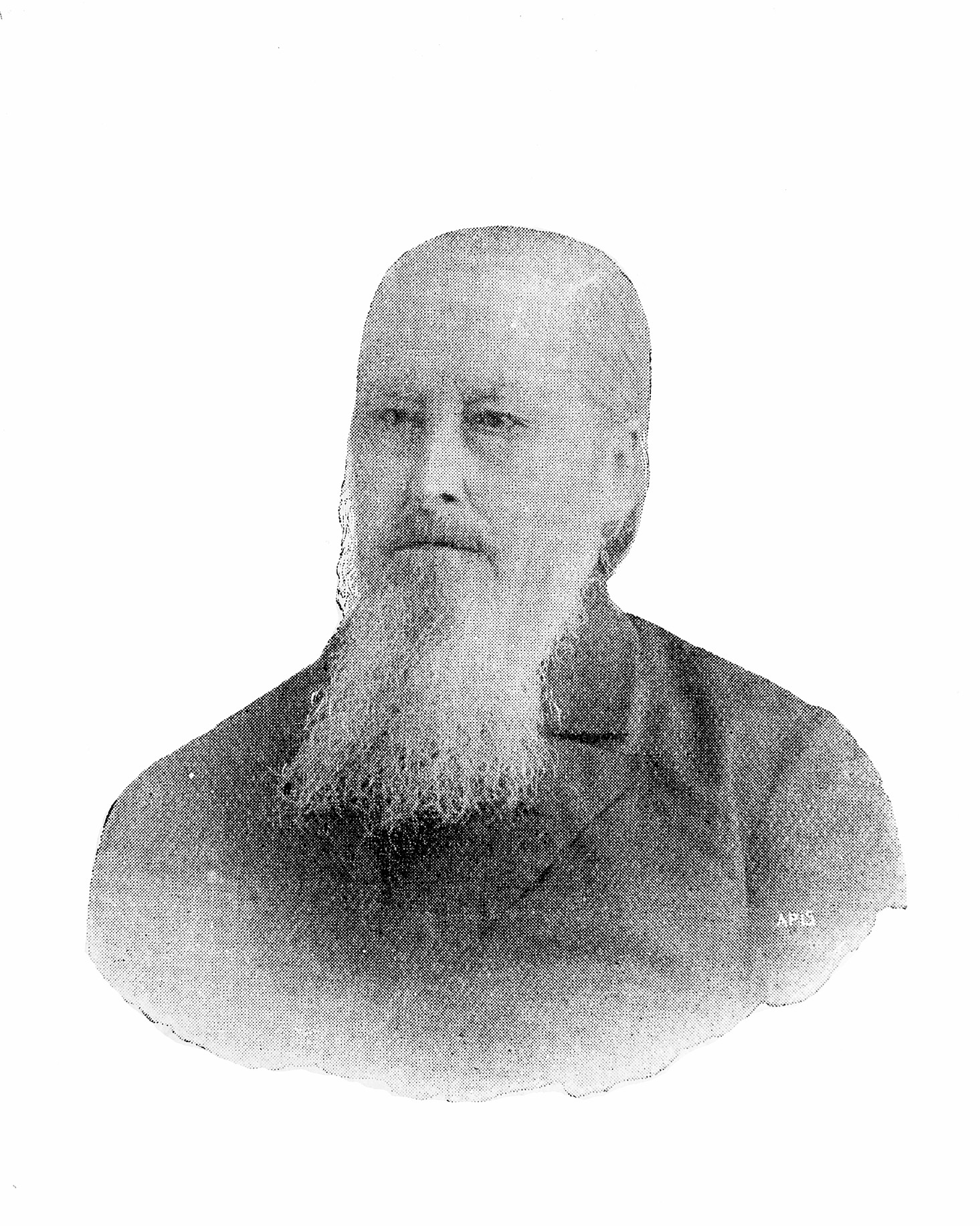
- Portrait. Credit: Wellcome Library
- Born: March 4, 1818; 1 Bucklersbury, City of London
- Died: May 19, 1905 (aged 87) 'Mimosa Cottage', Elswick St, Leichhardt, Sydney
- Occupation: alpaca farmer
- Known for: Work he did with quinine

Charles Ledger (4 March 1818 – 19 May 1905) was an alpaca farmer noted for his work in connection with quinine, a treatment for malaria.

== Background ==
Ledger belonged to a Huguenot family that emigrated to England in the 18th century; he was born at 1 Bucklersbury, City of London, the son of George Ledger, a mercantile broker, and his wife Charlotte, née Warren. It was at Lima that Charles rescued a drowning Indigenous person, Manuel Incra Mamani, who offered to become his servant.

== Quinine production ==
Ledger returned to South America in 1864. In some areas, the trees were being harvested without being replaced, and Europeans feared that their only effective antimalarial supply might become extinct. Using this as an excuse, the British and the Dutch sent out expeditions to source seeds and saplings to supply colonial plantations and secure a future for quinine mass-maufacture as an imperial project.

Ledger, however, employed Mamani to find a better variety for producing quinine. In 1865, after four years of frost destroying high-quinine plant seeds (plants with a lower proportion were hardier), Mamani was able to collect some seeds from a high-quinine specimen. Ledger sent them to his brother George Ledger in London. He tried to sell these to Kew, but having recently sourced their own supply, most were turned down. They were then purchased by the Dutch government who grew them in Java.

The high-quinine plant was named Cinchona ledgeriana, (a synonym of C. calisaya Wedd.) in honor of Ledger, rather than Mamani despite Ledger's open acknowledgement of Mamani's expertise and essential role in sourcing them.

In 1871, Mamani was arrested whilst on a seed hunting trip, and beaten so severely for this that he died soon afterwards. Ledger ceased to collect seeds and provided money to help Mamani's family.

== Impact ==
The cinchona trees collected by Mamani and distributed by Ledger were grown in Java and found to have an exceptionally high quinine content.
