= Francisco de Lugo (conquistador) =

Spanish conquistador (??–c.1532)

Francisco de Lugo (died c. 1532) was a Spanish conquistador. Described by Bernal Díaz del Castillo as "a man of uncommon bravery", he served with Hernán Cortés in the conquest of the Aztec Empire as one of his officers.

He was the hijo natural (illegitimate son) of nobleman Álvaro Yáñez de Lugo and first cousin, once removed of Alonso Fernández de Lugo, who conquered the last of the Canary Islands: La Palma and Tenerife. Born in Medina del Campo, Province of Valladolid, Francisco de Lugo travelled to Mexico as a conquistador along with his dog. He became a staunch supporter of Hernán Cortés, with whom he stood against Pánfilo de Narváez in May 1520. Later that year, he was one of the leaders of the fore guard during the Noche Triste, when the Spanish army was driven out of Tenochtitlan, and one of the signers of the Segura de la Frontera letter. After the Fall of Tenochtitlan in 1521, he joined Cristóbal de Olid's expedition to Honduras and later settled Coatzacoalcos, Veracruz, with Gonzalo de Sandoval. He died around 1532 of natural causes.

== See also ==
- Francisco de Lugo (1580–1652), theologian
