= Álvaro Yáñez de Lugo =

15th-century Spanish nobleman

Álvaro Yáñez de Lugo y Monterroso was a 15th-century Spanish nobleman from the house of Lugo in Galicia. He was a doncel in the royal court, later a knight and señor in Medina del Campo, royal chamberlain in Castile and royal scribe in Galicia. In his later years, he forged official documents with the help of a scribe, whom he killed. Despite his pleas, he was sentenced to die by Isabella I of Castile, an event which has been widely reported as idiosyncratic of the Queen's personality. In that context, Yáñez has been described as "a member of the petty nobility whose ancient responsibility for local justice the Monarchs sough to suppress". His illegitimate son was conquistador Francisco de Lugo.

== Biography ==
Born and raised in Lugo, he was son of Lope Alfonso Yáñez de Lugo y Ocampo and Teresa García de Baamonde. During his youth he was doncel in the court of John II of Castile. He was granted lands in Medina del Campo and made Lord of Villalba de Adaja and Foncastín in 1450. He later became camarero real of Henry IV of Castile and royal scribe of the Kingdom of Galicia.

In his later years, he was discovered to have committed forgery by asking a scribe to falsify official documents. He had then murdered the scribe and buried him in his house. For his crimes, he was sentenced to death by the Queen of Castile, Isabella I. He offered 40,000 doblas in exchange for a commutation of his sentence. Although her counsellors advised her to accept the plea, Isabella did not. De Lugo was executed and his lands, titles and possessions were inherited by his legitimate children. The event is described in Hernando del Pulgar's Crónica de los Reyes Católicos.

== Family ==
He was married to Juana Gutiérrez de Montalvo y Bobadilla and had several children. His official successor was Antonio de Lugo Rivera y Guzmán. Yáñez de Lugo's illegitimate son was Francisco de Lugo, a conquistador who fought alongside Hernán Cortés and died in Veracruz in 1532.

His brother, Pedro Fernández de Lugo y Monterroso, relocated to Seville, Andalusia, and had two children, both from Sanlúcar de Barrameda: Alonso and Pedro Fernández de Lugo y Escalante. The latter's second child was Alonso Fernández de Lugo y de las Casas, who conquered the last of the Canary Islands: La Palma and Tenerife. Alonso's son and successor was Pedro Fernández de Lugo, who died in Santa Marta, Colombia, in 1536. A descendant of Alonso's sister was Francisco Bahamonde de Lugo, Governor of Puerto Rico and Cartagena, who died in office in 1574.
