= Francesco Torti =

Italian physician

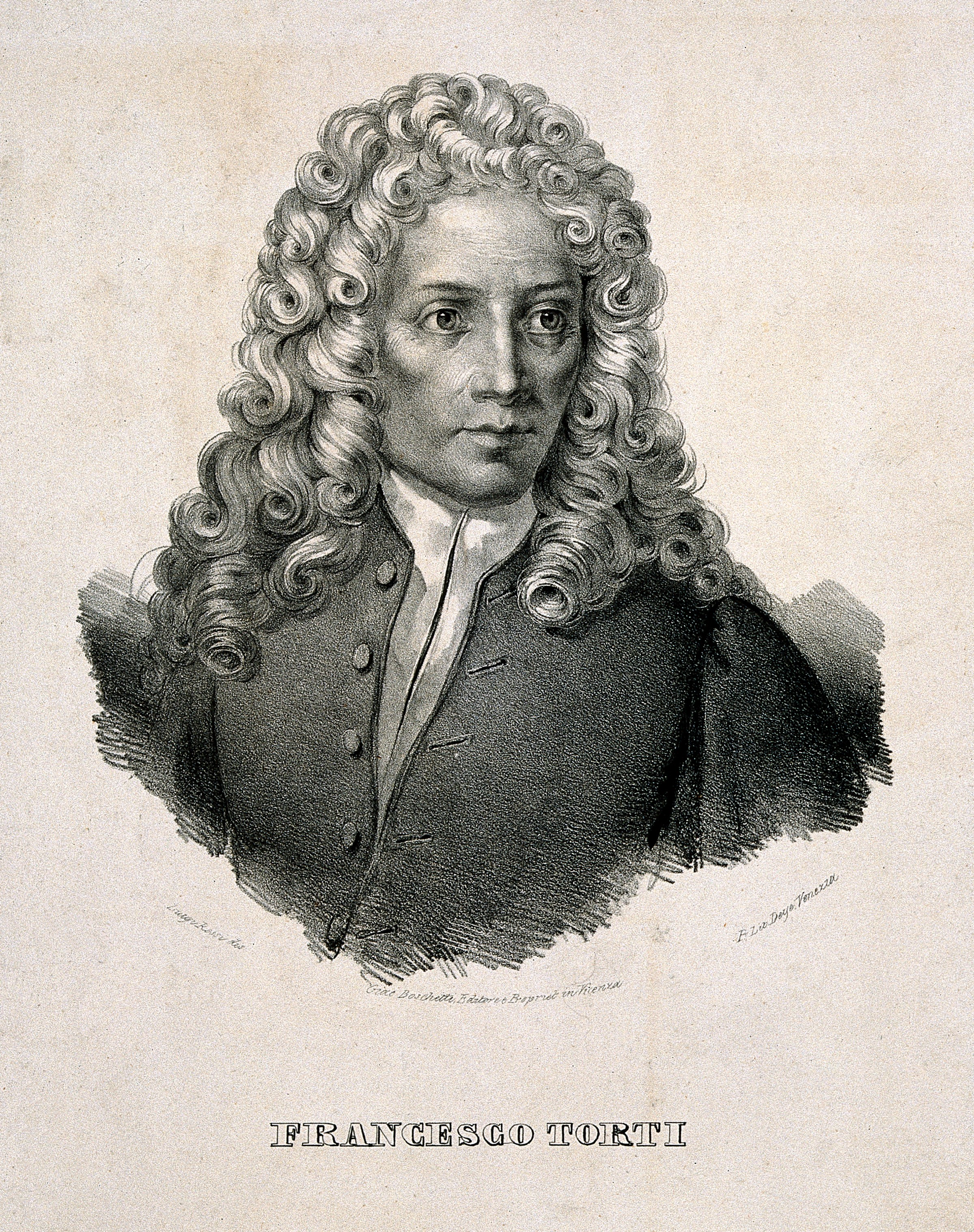

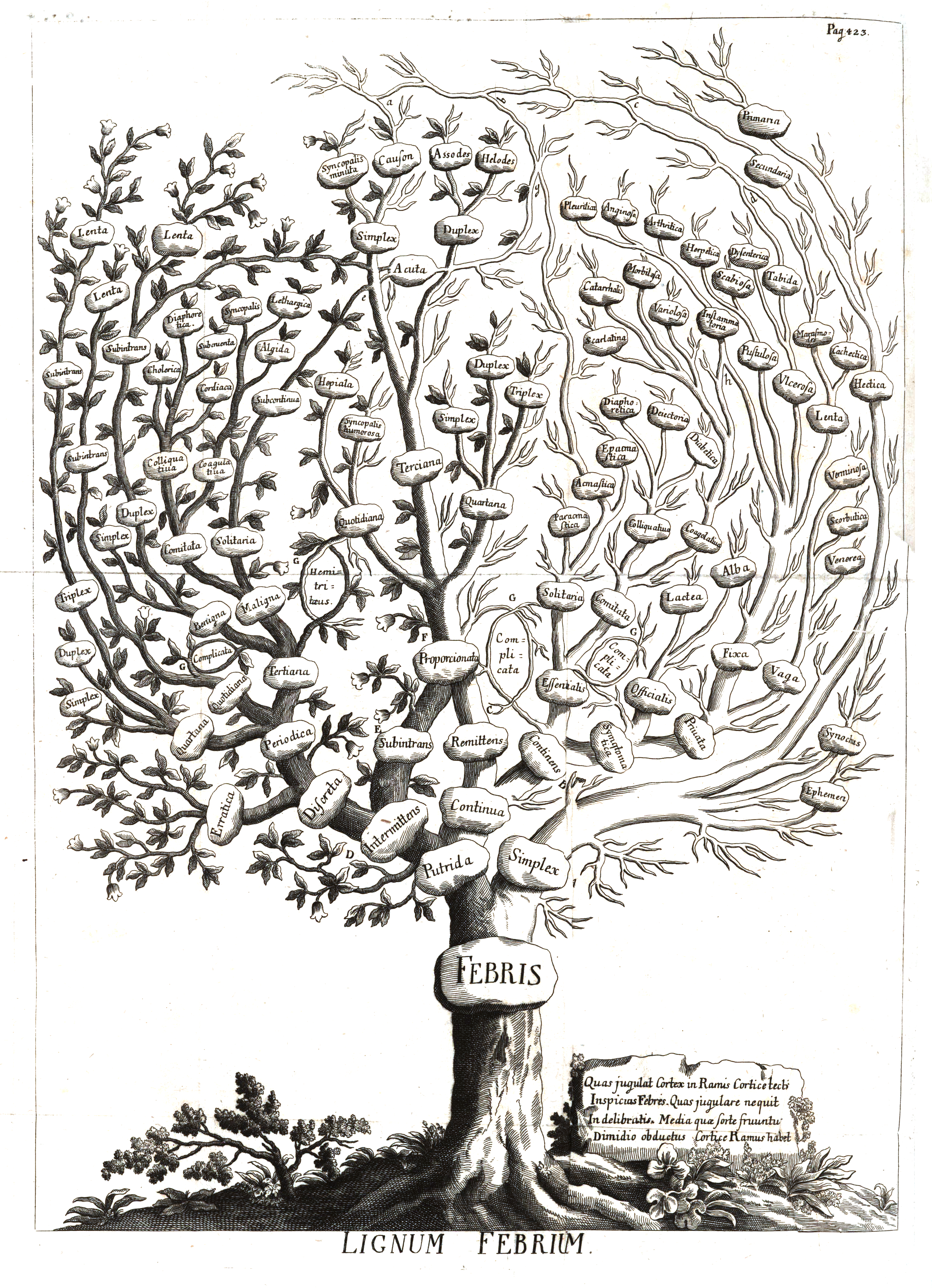
Lignum Febrium, a classificatory tree of fevers according to Torti (1756)

Francesco Torti (30 November 1658 – 15 February 1741) was an Italian physician.

== Biography ==
Torti was born in Modena and studied at the University of Bologna, graduating in 1678. In 1670 he and Bernardino Ramazzini headed the department of medicine in the newly created University of Modena. Under the patronage of the Duke of Modena, he instituted an amphitheater for anatomical observations.

He was the first to systematically study the effect of cinchona in the treatment of malaria. He prescribed a dosage that continued for a period of eight days beyond the febrile stage of malaria. As a physician, he was consulted by written correspondence by noblemen across Europe and a collection of 329 of his case studies were published into a two volume work in 2000. His major work was the Therapeutice Specialis ad Febres Quasdam Perniciosas (1712, online). Torti was the first to demonstrate the effectiveness of cinchona bark in the treatment of malaria. He was elected Fellow of the Royal Society in 1717. Although some sources consider him to have introduced the word "malaria", he never used the term in his writings. It was used mainly in folk medicine in Italy and appears even earlier in the writings of Florence Leonardo Bruni (1476).

Apart from medical writings, Torti also wrote poetry. Although married twice, he had no children. His manuscripts are archived in the Biblioteca Estense. He was buried in the church of Santa Maria della Pomposa, Modena and a square is named after him in Modena. A biography was written by his fellow Modenese, Muratori.

== Published works ==
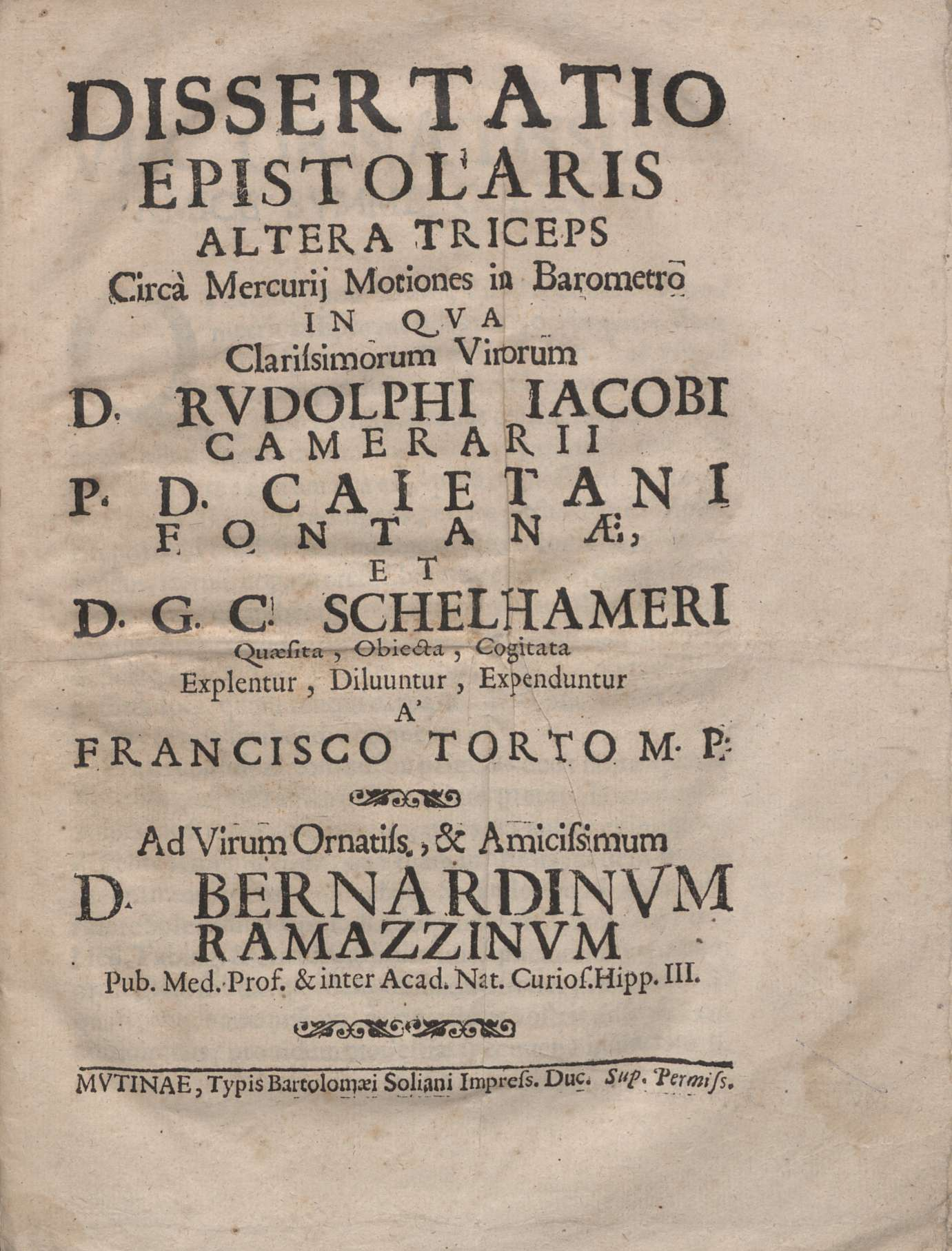
Dissertatio epistolaris altera triceps circa mercuriii motiones in barometro, 1692

- Dissertatio epistolaris altera triceps circa mercuriii motiones in barometro (in Latin). Modena: Bartolomeo Soliani (1.). 1692.
- Therapeutice specialis ad febres quasdam perniciosas, inopinato ac repente lethales, una vero chinachina peculiari methodo ministrata (Modena, 1790, octavo)
- Responsiones iatro-apologeticae at criticam dissertat de abusu chinaechinae (Modena, 1715)
- Mutinesium medicorum methodus antipyretica vindicata (Modena, 1819)

== See also ==
- History of malaria
