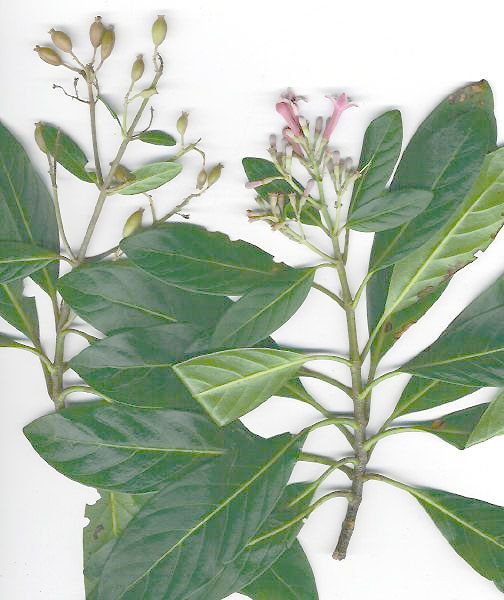
- Branchlets with flowers and fruits

Scientific classification
- Kingdom: Plantae
- Clade: Tracheophytes
- Clade: Angiosperms
- Clade: Eudicots
- Clade: Asterids
- Order: Gentianales
- Family: Rubiaceae
- Genus: Cinchona
- Species: C. calisaya

Binomial name
- Cinchona calisaya Wedd.
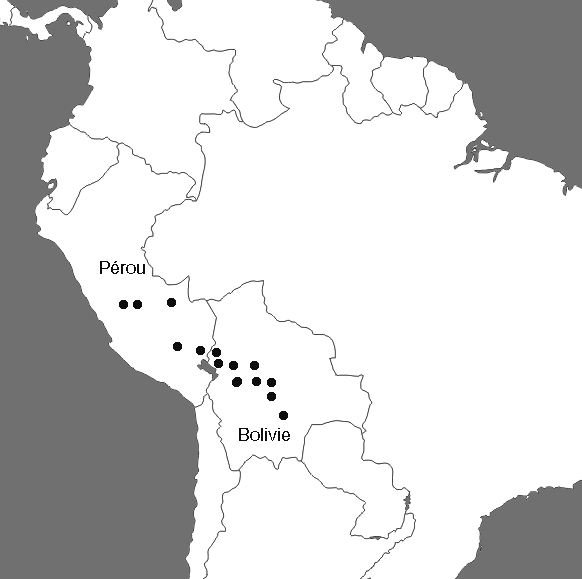
- Distribution range

Synonyms
- C. ledgeriana

= Cinchona calisaya =

Species of plant

Cinchona calisaya is a species of shrub or tree in the family Rubiaceae. It is native to the forests of the eastern slopes of the Andes, where they grow from 200–3,300 metres (660–10,830 ft) in elevation in Peru and Bolivia. The species is known for a high quinine content, a key antimalarial alkaloid. From the 1860s, it was grown in plantations (under the synonym C. ledgeriana Wedd.) in the Dutch East Indies to supply the global quinine trade.

== Toxicity ==
Cinchona bark and its quinine alkaloids can cause cardiac sodium and potassium channel blockade, CNS and renal toxicity. Cinchonism trio: GI upset, headaches, and tinnitus. Ventricular arrhythmias, hypoglycemia, renal failure, respiratory failure, jaundice and death.
