= Francisco de Lugo =

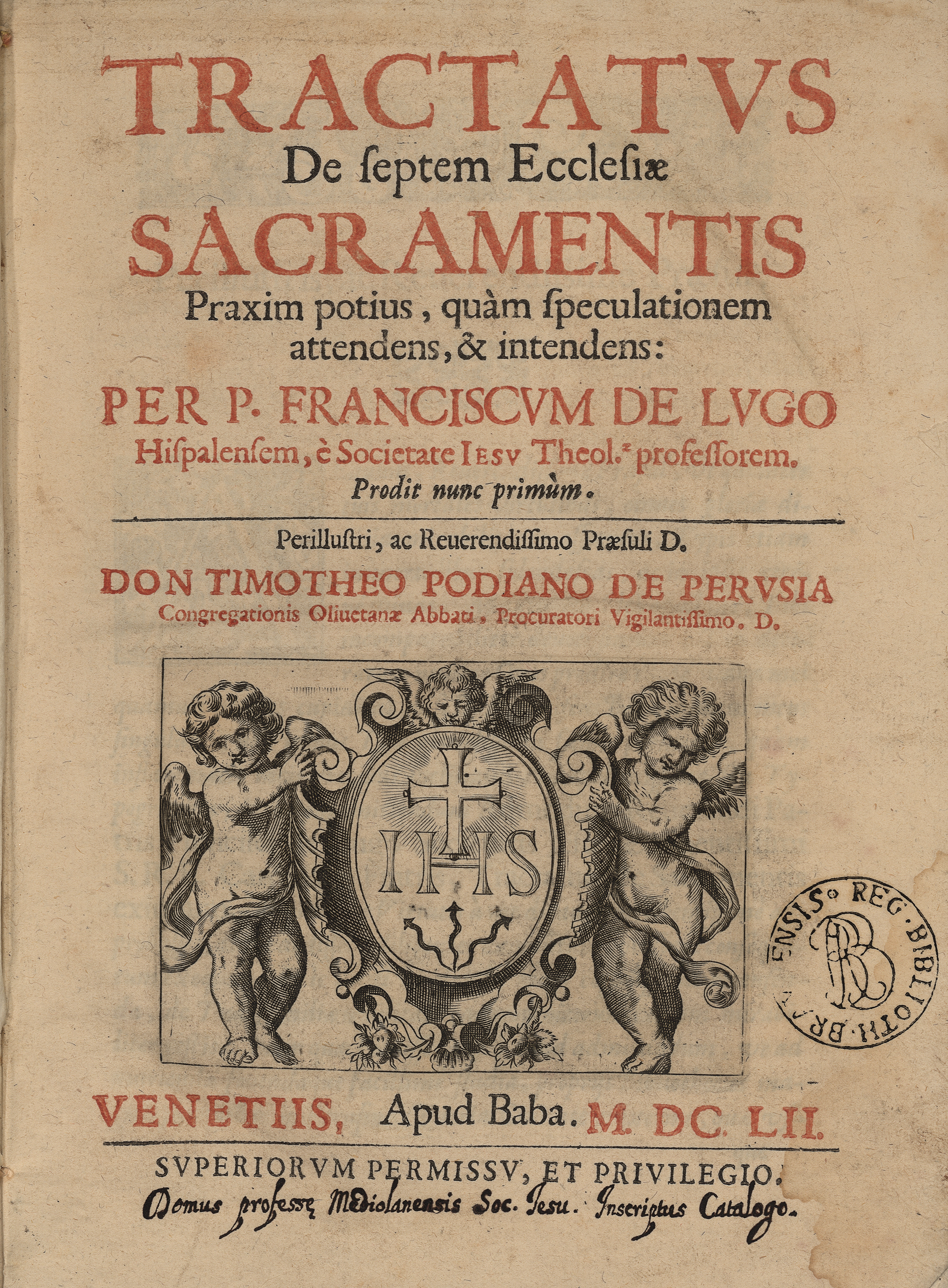
De septem Ecclesiae sacramentis, 1652

Francisco de Lugo (1580–1652) was a Spanish Jesuit theologian. He briefly taught theology at the Universidad Javeriana in Santa Fe de Bogota, New Kingdom of Granada before moving to Mexico. During his time in America, he wrote several works which were published upon his return to Spain.

== Biography ==
Born in Madrid, Francisco de Lugo was the elder brother of Cardinal John de Lugo, and, like him, a distinguished member of the Society of Jesus, which he entered at the novitiate of Salamanca in 1600.

In answer to his request for the foreign missions, he was sent to New Kingdom of Granada in 1619, where, quite apart from any desire of his own, he was appointed to teach theology at the Universidad Javeriana. In 1623, he was sent to Mexico. Being recalled to Spain, he sailed in company with others under the protection of the Spanish fleet; but during the voyage the Spanish encountered the Dutch, and in the ensuing struggle, de Lugo, although he succeeded in saving his life, could not save the greater part of his commentary on the entire Summa of St. Thomas. He subsequently taught both philosophy and theology in Spain, was a censor of books, and theologian to the general of the Society of Jesus in Rome.

Having been twice rector of the College of Valladolid, he died in Valladolid on 17 September 1652 with the reputation of being a fine theologian and a holy and humble man.

== Writings ==
- Theologia scholastica
- Decursus prævius ad theologiam moralem
- De septem Ecclesiæ sacramentis, praxim potius quam speculationem, attendens et intendens
- De sacramentis in genere
