= Ague =

Ague may refer to:

- Fever
- Malaria
- Agué, Benin
- Duck ague, a hunting term

== See also ==
- Kan Ague, a residential area of Patikul, Sulu, Philippines
