= Malaria in the River Thames =

Historic endemic illness of London

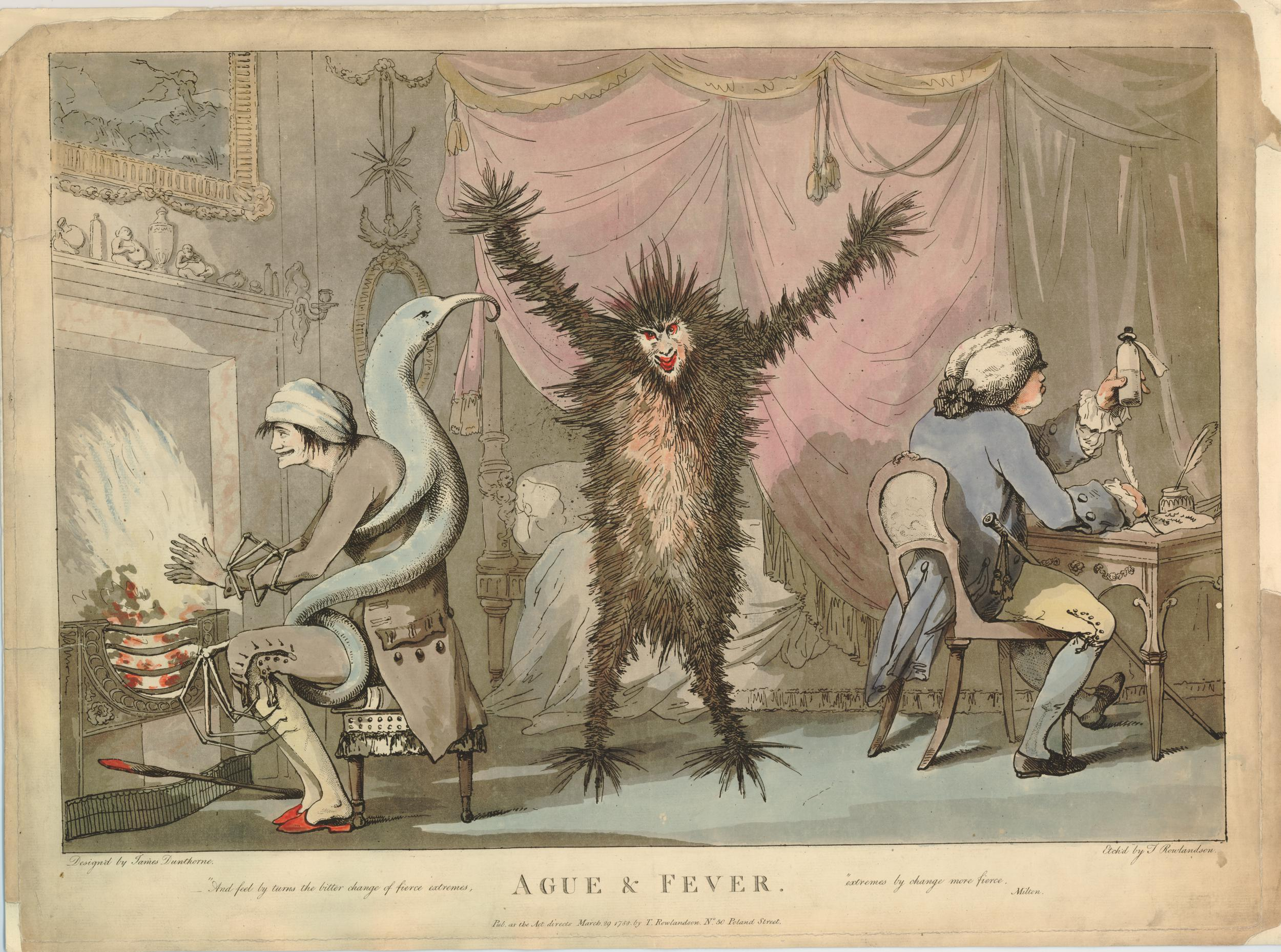
"Ague & fever" seize a shivering patient in an elite 18th-century household (Thomas Rowlandson, British Museum). Prominent Londoners died of malaria.

Malaria was a common affliction in populations that lived beside the River Thames until the middle of the Victorian era, not only in its estuary, but even in central London. It was frequently lethal. Some cases continued to occur until early in the 20th century. Why malaria died out in England is rather unclear.

== Thames marshes ==
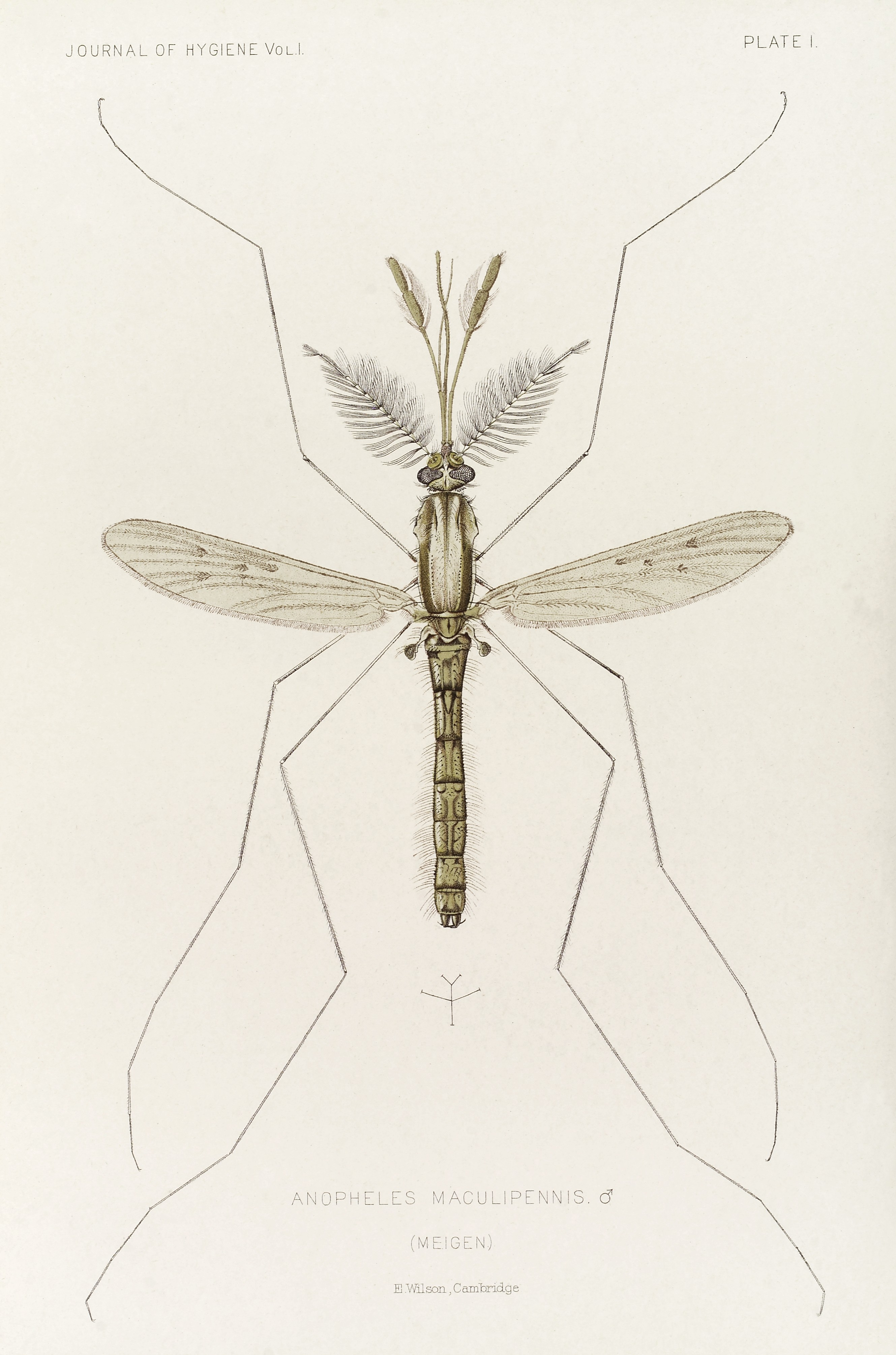
A. atroparvus, vector of malaria in the Thames (Wellcome)

Malaria was commonplace in the Thames marshes, including London, and was called "ague" or "marsh fever". While not all agues were caused by malaria, most scholars believe true malaria – the protozoan infection – was indeed present. Descriptions in early 19th century medical textbooks leave little doubt, since:

they invariably refer to noncontagious transmission, distinctive cold, hot, and sweating stages, tertian onset of symptoms, cycling relapses, anemia, splenomegaly or 'ague cake' [an enlarged spleen], and susceptibility to quinine.

It was mainly transmitted by the mosquito Anopheles atroparvus, and was frequently lethal, though this has been disputed. It was so bad that most clergymen refused to reside in their parishes, where these were near the marshes.

== Introduction of the disease to Britain ==
Possibly malaria was introduced by the Roman invaders; evidence from skeletons suggests the disease was present in Anglo-Saxon England.

== Endemicity ==
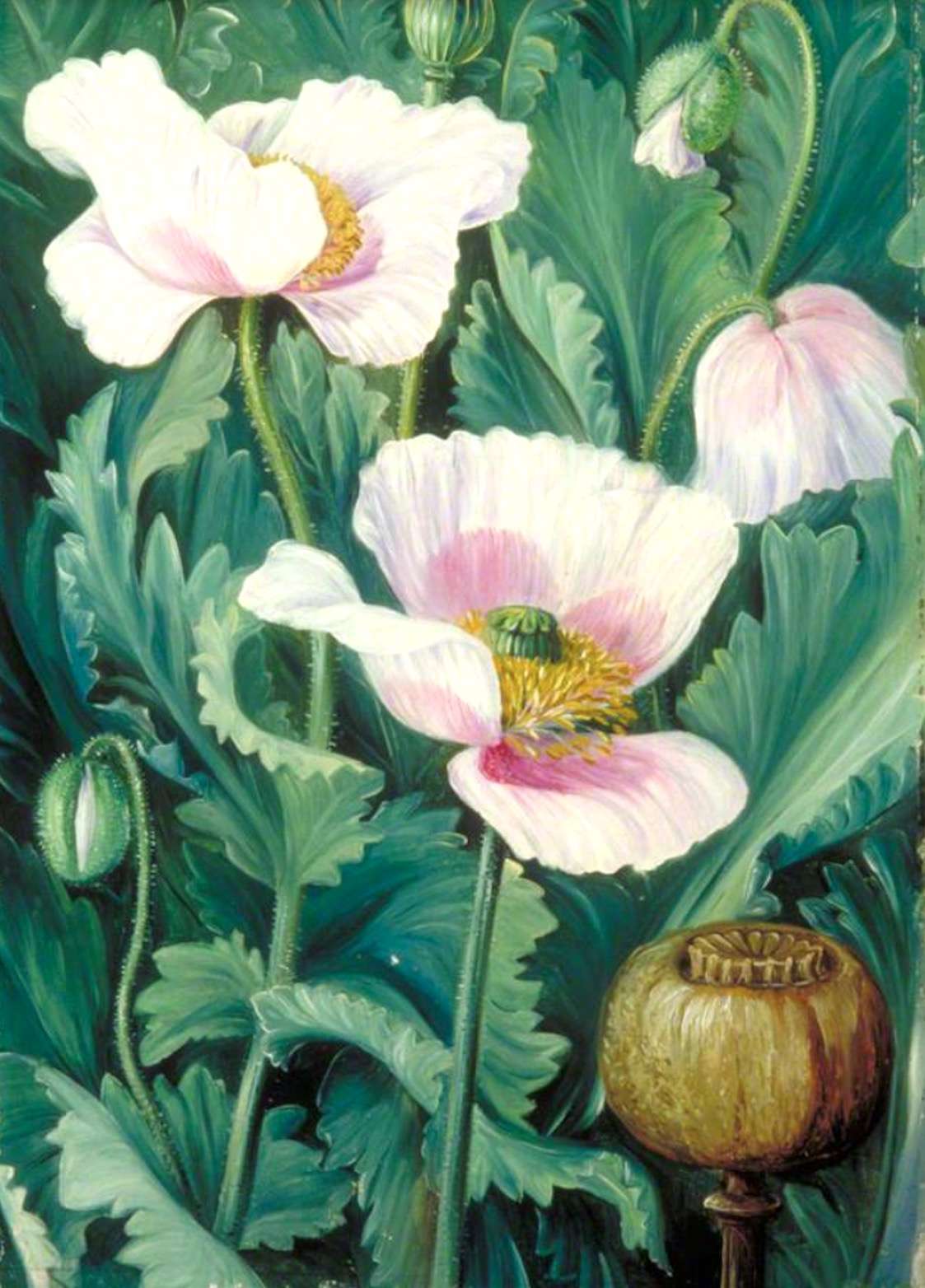
Opium poppies were cultivated in the marshes (Marianne North Gallery)

It was anyway rife by the 16th century, though the climate (the "Little Ice Age") was colder than today. James I and Oliver Cromwell were thought to have died of it, and it was prevalent in London before and after the Great Fire. Shakespeare mentions ague in eight of his plays as if his London audiences would be familiar with aspects of the disease.

Mary Dobson said that

in the low-lying parishes bordering the River Thames and the River Medway ... burial rates were three or four times as high as those of the healthiest downland communities.

Writing around 1800, Edward Hasted noted

it is not unusual to see a poor man, his wife, and whole family of five or six children, hovering over their fire in their hovel, shaking with an ague all at the same time.

The heavy use of opium (often consumed as poppy-head tea) and alcohol to fight the fever was commonplace. Later, the disease was combated with quinine; that this treatment was effective tends to confirm it was malaria, and not some unrelated malady.

== London ==
At Guy's Hospital they frequently received ague cases from the Thames marshes, William Gull told the House of Commons in 1854. About a half came from Woolwich and Erith, but cases also came from Wapping and Shadwell, and along the river from Bermondsey and Lambeth and even Westminster. (At that time it was believed the disease came from breathing bad air – mal-aria – arising from marshes. Gull recommended the marshes should be drained.)

== Decline and disappearance ==
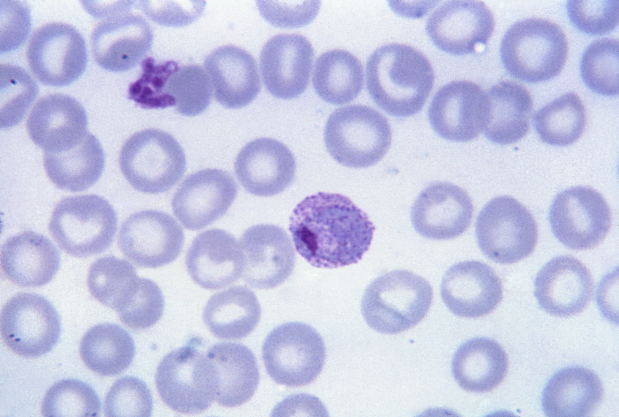
Plasmodium vivax, cause of malaria in the Thames

Generally, deaths started to decline after 1800, although there was a fairly sharp peak around 1860. Some cases occurred in all parts of England (and even in Scotland), but by far the worst area was in the Thames (and the Fens of Cambridgeshire).

By the end of the Victorian era indigenous malaria had nearly disappeared from England, but a few cases survived into the 20th century enabling the disease to be positively identified by blood tests. It was probably caused by the protozoan parasite Plasmodium vivax.

While the draining of the Thames marshes did not, by itself, eradicate malaria – in places the mosquito still abounds – it may have been a contributory cause. Why it did disappear is complex and uncertain. The mosquito prefers to take blood from livestock, so increasing livestock densities (brought about by the introduction of root crops as winter fodder) may have diverted biting from humans to domestic animals. Other factors may have included better housing, health care, sanitation and hygiene (by helping to reduce transmission rates), smaller rural populations as manual labour was replaced by machinery, and better insulation of houses in winter.

== Exogenous malaria ==
According to Kuhn et all exogenous malaria continues to be brought from abroad by travellers; since the 1950s there have been more than 50,000 cases; but apparently none have led to secondary infections among the resident population: The last statement requires qualification. During the latter stages of World War I malaria was contracted by soldiers and civilians "who had never set foot abroad". There were cases at military sites near Sheerness and on the Isle of Grain, where Anopheles mosquitos were generally abundant; Ministry of Health officials believed the parasite was brought in by troops demobilised from the Salonika Campaign, Egypt and German East Africa. That demobilised troops might spread malaria across Britain worried the authorities.

== Global warming and British malaria ==
In 2002 the Chief Medical Officer predicted that by 2050 the British climate might so warm that indigenous malaria would be re-established. However, a paper by Kuhn et al in Proceedings of the National Academy of Sciences, examining historical data, disagreed. Temperature and rainfall were just two factors tending to increase transmissibility of malaria, but wetland acreage and cattle population were more important. The projected climate change, by itself, was "clearly insufficient".

== See also ==
- Embanking of the tidal Thames
- History of malaria

== Sources ==
- Bankoff, Greg (2018). "Malaria, Water Management, and Identity in the English Lowlands". Environmental History. 23 (3): 470–494. doi:10.1093/envhis/emx137.
- Coates, Peter (2022). "Fighting nuisance on the northern fringe: Controlling mosquitoes in Britain between the World Wars". In Hall, Marcus; Tamir, Dan (eds.). Mosquitopia: The Place of Pests in a Healthy World. New York: Routledge. doi:10.4324/9781003056034.
- Dobson, Mary (1980). ""Marsh Fever" – the geography of malaria in England". Journal of Historical Geography. 6 (4): 357–389. doi:10.1016/0305-7488(80)90145-0. PMID 11632265.
- Gowland, G.L.; Western, A.G. (2012). "Morbidity in the Marshes: Using Spatial Epidemiology to Investigate Skeletal Evidence for Malaria in Anglo-Saxon England (AD 410–1050)". American Journal of Physical Anthropology. 147 (2): 301–311. doi:10.1002/ajpa.21648. PMID 22183814.
- Gull, W.W. (1854). "Condition of the Thames Marshes". The Civil Engineer and Architect's Journal. XVII. London: R. Groombridge & Sons.
- Hutchinson, Robert A. (2004). Mosquito borne diseases in England: past, present and future risks, with special reference to malaria in the Kent Marshes (PDF) (PhD thesis). Durham University.
- Kuhn, K.G.; Campbell-Lendrum, D.H.; Armstrong, B.; Davies, C.R. (2003). "Malaria in Britain: past, present, and future". Proceedings of the National Academy of Sciences. 100 (17): 9997–10001. Bibcode:2003PNAS..100.9997K. doi:10.1073/pnas.1233687100. PMC 188345. PMID 12913128.
- Reiter, P. (2000). "From Shakespeare to Defoe: malaria in England in the Little Ice Age". Emerging Infectious Diseases. 6 (1): 1–11. doi:10.3201/eid0601.000101. PMC 2627969. PMID 10653562.
