= Inosine nucleosidase =

Class of enzymes

Identifiers
- EC no.: 3.2.2.2
- CAS no.: 9030-95-9

Databases
- BRENDA: enzyme data
- ExPASy: NiceZyme view
- KEGG: enzyme entry
- MetaCyc: metabolic pathway
- Rhea: reactions
- PDB structures: RCSB PDB PDBe PDBsum
- Gene Ontology: AmiGO / QuickGO
Search
- PMC: articles
- PubMed: articles
- NCBI: proteins

Inosine nucleosidase (EC 3.2.2.2) is an enzyme that catalyzes the chemical reaction

inosine
H_{2}O
hypoxanthine
+
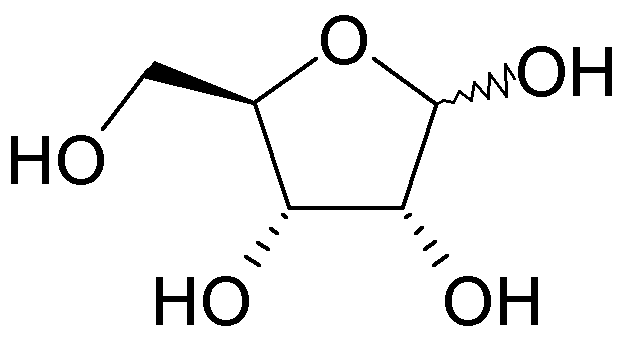
D-ribose

The enzyme characterised from Escherichia coli and fish muscle hydrolyses the purine nucleoside, inosine, to hypoxanthine and D-ribose.

This enzyme is a hydrolase, specifically a glycosylase that hydrolyses N-glycosyl compounds. The systematic name of this enzyme class is inosine ribohydrolase. Other names in common use include inosinase, and inosine-guanosine nucleosidase.
