= Futalosine hydrolase =

Class of enzymes

Identifiers
- EC no.: 3.2.2.26

Databases
- BRENDA: enzyme data
- ExPASy: NiceZyme view
- KEGG: enzyme entry
- MetaCyc: metabolic pathway
- Rhea: reactions
- PDB structures: RCSB PDB PDBe PDBsum
Search
- PMC: articles
- PubMed: articles
- NCBI: proteins

Futalosine hydrolase (EC 3.2.2.26, futalosine nucleosidase, MqnB) is an enzyme with systematic name futalosine ribohydrolase. It catalyses the following chemical reaction:

futalosine
H_{2}O
dehypoxanthine futalosine
+
hypoxanthine

The enzyme characterised from Streptomyces species hydrolyses futalosine to dehypoxanthine futalosine and hypoxanthine as a step in the biosnthesis of menaquinone in some prokaryotes. The enzyme has been studied as a means of regulating menaquinone production, and as a means of controlling Helicobacter pylori, a cause of peptic ulcer disease.
