= Deliverance (novel) =

1970 novel by James Dickey

- First edition
- Author: James Dickey
- Language: English
- Genre: Thriller, adventure
- Publisher: Houghton Mifflin
- Publication date: 1 June 1970
- Publication place: United States
- Media type: Print (hardback & paperback)
- Pages: 284 pp
- ISBN: 978-0-385-31387-2
- OCLC: 31312271

Deliverance (1970) is the debut novel of American writer James Dickey, who had previously published poetry. It was adapted into the 1972 film of the same name directed by John Boorman which was nominated for the Academy Award for Best Picture.

In 1998, the editors of the Modern Library placed Deliverance as #42 on their list of the 100 best 20th-Century novels. In 2005, the novel was included on Time magazine's list of the 100 best English-language novels written since 1923.

== Plot ==
Narrated in the first person by Ed Gentry, a graphic artist and one of the four main characters, the novel opens with him and three friends, all middle-aged, middle-class men who live in a large city in Georgia, planning a weekend canoe trip down the fictional Cahulawassee River in the northwest Georgia wilderness. It's a last chance to travel on this wild river, which is scheduled to be dammed to create a reservoir and generate hydropower. Besides Ed, the protagonists are insurance salesman Bobby Trippe, soft drink executive Drew Ballinger, and landlord Lewis Medlock, a physically fit outdoorsman who has promoted the canoe trip.

The men drive into the mountains with two canoes. At a gas station in a mountain hamlet, Drew sees a local albino boy playing a banjo. He gets out his own guitar and plays a duet with the boy, who appears to be intellectually disabled, and possibly inbred, but with great musical skills. The men arrange with local mechanics, the Griner brothers, to drive the foursome's cars to the fictitious town of Aintry, where the canoe voyage is scheduled to end two days later. The visitors put their canoes in the river and begin their journey. After they shoot some initial rapids and evening approaches, Ed reflects on the isolation into which the group has now voyaged.

The following morning, Ed awakes early and goes hunting with his bow and arrow. Sighting a deer, he shoots but misses because he loses his nerve at the last moment. Lewis is unimpressed, and Ed gets annoyed by his survivalist mentality. After breaking camp, Ed and Bobby set out in one canoe slightly ahead of Lewis and Drew. Since the night in camp, Bobby has changed his mind about the trip. He is frustrated by Lewis's leadership, so Ed takes him as a canoe partner to keep the two apart.

Sometime that afternoon, Bobby and Ed pull the canoe over to take a break and let Lewis and Drew catch up after a small separation. As they are waiting, two men step out of the woods. After a tense conversation these men attack Ed and Bobby. The men force them a bit further into the woods; Ed is tied to a tree by his neck and cut with his own knife, and the two men order Bobby to strip from the waist down. The two men force Bobby to bend over a log, and the older man rapes him. The men then untie Ed, and the younger makes Ed kneel, about to force Ed to fellate him. Lewis, hidden in the woods, fatally shoots the older assailant with an arrow as the shotgun is handed off from the younger man to the older. Ed snatches the gun from the shot man after he falls, while the other flees into the woods.

The city men argue about what to do. Lewis wants to bury the body, arguing that if they inform the police, they might be convicted by a jury consisting of the dead man's relatives. Drew wants to turn the body over to police in Aintry. Bobby is ashamed and furious about his assault, and agrees with Lewis on trying to hide the body. After a heated exchange, Ed also sides with Lewis. The men bury the body and return to their canoes, with Ed and Drew teamed up again. That evening they enter a high gorge with powerful rapids. Drew mysteriously falls out of his canoe and is pulled downriver, both canoes capsize, and Lewis breaks his leg on the rocks. The wooden canoe breaks up in the rapids.

Lewis insists that Drew was shot by the escaped mountain man. Ed is less certain, but realizes that if the mountain man is at the top of the gorge, he can shoot each of them before they can make it downriver. He decides to climb up the gorge to kill the mountain man with his bow and arrow.

Ed briefs Bobby about taking Lewis downriver in the remaining canoe at first light in order to avoid being shot. Ed climbs to the top of the gorge, and hides to await the rifleman. Early the following morning, a man with a rifle appears. The rifleman and Ed shoot at each other simultaneously. The rifle shot misses Ed, but knocks him from the tree in which he was perched. Ed is gored by one of his own arrows as he lands. He tracks the rifleman and finds him dead nearby, shot by Ed's arrow. Ed returns the body to the top of the cliff. As he does, he sees the canoe with Lewis and Bobby moving out into the river in the full light. Ed tries to lower the body down to the riverbank so Bobby can identify him, but it lands on rocks, destroying the face and leaving it unrecognizable. The men never know if Ed has killed their attacker or just an unrelated hunter at the top of the gorge. The pair weight and sink the corpse, along with other evidence. Ed, Bobby, and the severely injured Lewis then continue the journey in the remaining canoe. Internally, Ed begins having homicidal fantasies of killing Bobby, whom he views as a fat, useless club-dweller, via eviscerating him and mutilating his remains, which he reflects in harsh rebukes towards the latter.

Below the gorge, they find Drew's body. Ed brings Drew's body to Lewis and asks if he thinks Drew was shot or if the wound on his head could have been caused by a rock. Lewis believes Drew was shot, but they have no way to confirm for certain. Ed and Bobby sink Drew's body in the river to hide the evidence of any crime.

Some time later, the men reach Aintry, where they explain that they suffered a canoeing accident at a falls upriver and that their friend Drew must have drowned. Ed and Bobby believe they have their story straight, while Lewis feigns having only fleeting memories of the "accident" and thereby escapes questioning—but they soon learn that fragments of their demolished wooden canoe were recovered in Aintry a full day ahead of when they claim their accident occurred. They modify their story to reconcile this, claiming to have piled all four men into the remaining aluminum canoe, which suffered an accident wherein Drew was lost and assumed drowned. The deputy sheriff grows highly suspicious of them and tells the sheriff that his brother-in-law has been missing since the weekend, but the Sheriff, after he and his men drag the river searching for Drew's body, lets the threesome depart, warning them never to return to Aintry.

Ed returns to city life, feeling changed by the violent events and memories of the river. Now that the river is dammed, it exists only in his mind. He occasionally sees Bobby, but the latter moves to Hawaii. Ed and his wife later buy a cabin on another "dammed lake," and Lewis buys a neighboring cottage. Lewis is marked by a limp, but the two city men return outwardly to their previous lives.

== Reception ==
Kirkus Reviews wrote that "James Dickey's first novel is an ambitious tale of adventure in which character is tested, quite literally, if preposterously, through action."

Literary critic, philosopher, and theorist Fredric Jameson reviewed the book in a 1972 essay and used it for an extensive analysis of contemporary American society. (Note: Jameson wrote, "Now, perhaps, we are in better position to understand what kind of a confrontation it was for which Dickey's heroes had prepared themselves: it was the Thirties they went forth to meet - in some obscure way they journeyed into the wilderness to settle their accounts with the great radical tradition of the American past. The new heroes whose legend Deliverance passes down to us are the frightened men of the modern American suburb, men for whom Nature is a kind of unconscious synonym of underdevelopment.")

== Adaptations ==
The book was adapted in the 1972 film of the same name, on a screenplay written by Dickey. It was directed by John Boorman and starred Burt Reynolds, Jon Voight, Ned Beatty, and Ronny Cox.
