= Duck ague =

In hunting, losing mental calm and missing a shot

Duck ague, also buck fever or buck ague, is a hunting term for the yips, in which a marksman or hunter, before taking a shot with either a gun or bow in a tense situation, loses mental quietude and misses the shot.

== Popular culture ==
In James Dickey's 1970 novel Deliverance and its 1972 film adaptation, a character suffers from duck ague before shooting a wild deer, after which another character describes the phenomenon, saying "Hell, I've known tournament archers, damn good shots, never out of the five ring. Draw down on a live animal, they get buck ague."

In the final scene of the 1951 film Fort Worth, one character tells another, "Now don't get buck ague."
