= Malaria culture =

Method for growing malaria parasites outside the body

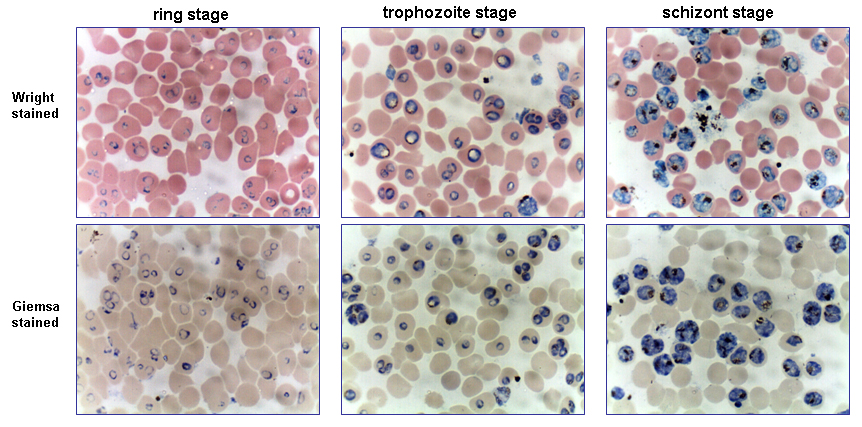
P. falciparum cultures

Malaria culture is a method for growing malaria parasites outside the body, i.e., in an ex vivo environment. Although attempts for propagation of the parasites outside of humans or animal models reach as far back as 1912, the success of the initial attempts was limited to one or just a few cycles. The first successful continuous culture was established in 1976. Initial hopes that the ex vivo culture would lead quickly to the discovery of a vaccine were premature. However, the development of new drugs was greatly facilitated.

== Method ==
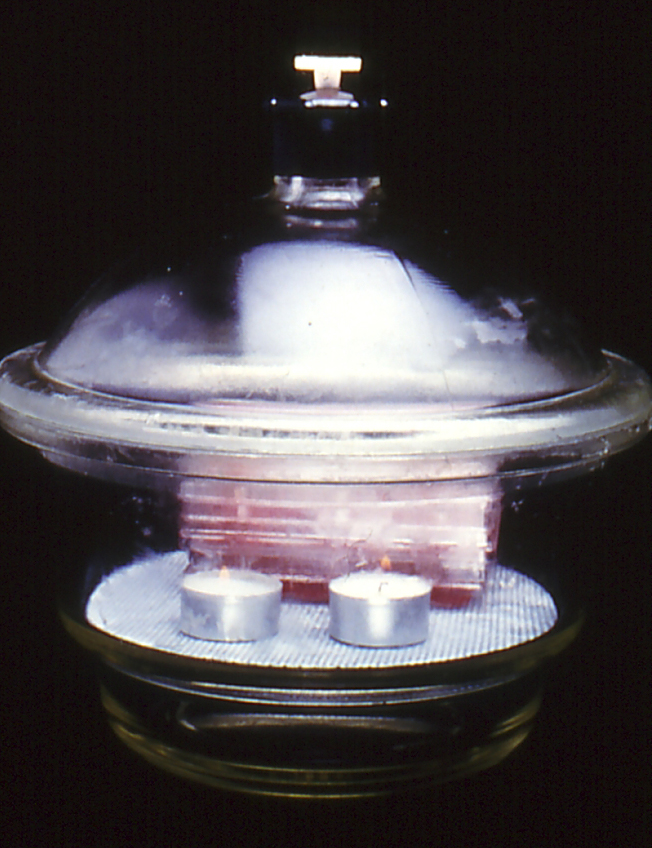
Candlejar

Infected human red blood cells are incubated in a culture dish or flask at 37 °C together with a nutrient medium and plasma, serum or serum substitutes. A special feature of the incubation is the special gas mixture filled with nitrogen (90-92 %), CO_{2} (5 %) and oxygen (3-5 %), allowing the parasites to grow at 37 °C in a cell incubator. An alternative to gassing the cultures with the exact gas mixture, is the use of a candlejar. The candlejar is an airtight container in which the cultures and a lit candle are placed. The burning candle consumes some of the oxygen and produces carbon dioxide (CO_{2}), which acts as a fire extinguisher. Carbon dioxide content in fresh air varies between 0.036 % and 0.039 %. Once the CO_{2} concentration reaches approximately 5 %, the candle stops burning. The number of parasites increased by a factor 5 approximately every 48 hours (one cycle). The parasitemia can be determined via blood film, to keep it within the wanted limits, the culture can be thinned out with healthy red blood cells.

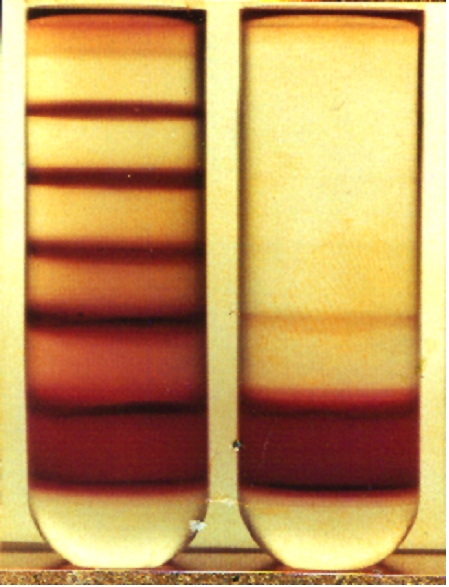
Concentration of P. falciparum-infected erythrocytes by discontinuous density gradient centrifugation in Percoll.

The original method for the successful ex vivo propagation of P. falciparum described culture of the parasite under static conditions (Trager-Jensen method). James B. Jensen joined Trager's laboratory as a post-doctoral fellow in 1976. He decided to employ a candlejar instead of the CO_{2} incubator. In the summer of 1976 Milton Friedman, a graduate student in the Trager lab who was working in the MRC laboratories in The Gambia, arranged for a sample of human blood infected with P. falciparum to be sent to New York City. This was diluted with RPMI 1640 (which turned out to be the best of the commercial media) in Petri dishes, placed in a candlejar and incubated. The line grew very well and became FCR-3/Gambia, one of the most widely used strains. Later, other lines would be established using similar methods and the impact of continuous cultivation of P. falciparum was phenomenal especially for the testing of putative antimalarials and for deciphering its genes. A number of subsequent reports (from as far back as the early 1980s), showed that cell suspension (using a shaking-incubator) significantly increased culture growth. Continuous agitation has also been shown to improve other parameters of culture growth relevant to researchers, such as the prolongation of culture synchrony after synchronization procedures, and a reduction of the rate of multiple infections. Despite this, the practice of culturing the parasite under static conditions remains widespread. The greatest value of the candlejar method is that it can be used in laboratories almost anywhere in the world where there is an incubator, a candle and a desiccator. Around 60% parasitized cells can be obtained using optimized culturing conditions. Recent studies of P. falciparum isolated directly from infected patients indicate that alternative parasite biological states occur in the natural host that are not observed with ex vivo cultivated parasites.

== Concentration of infected cells ==
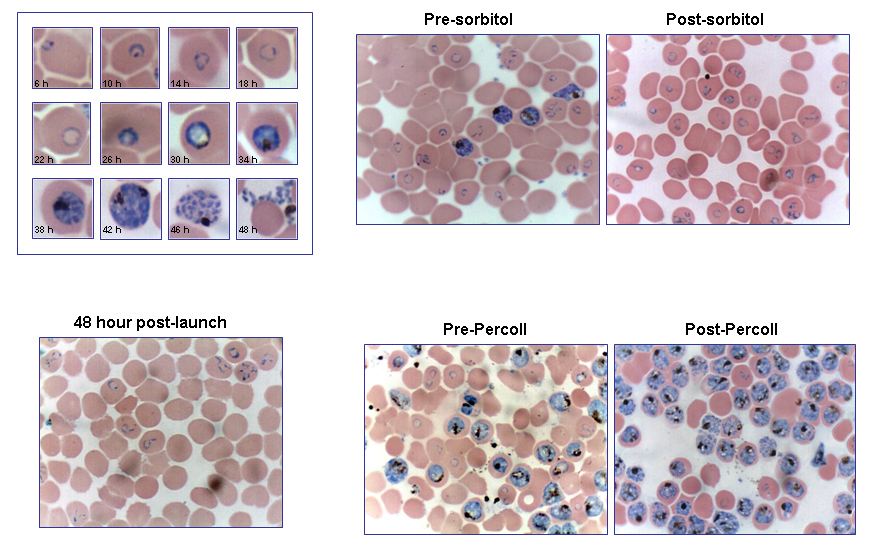
Blood stages of P.falciparum

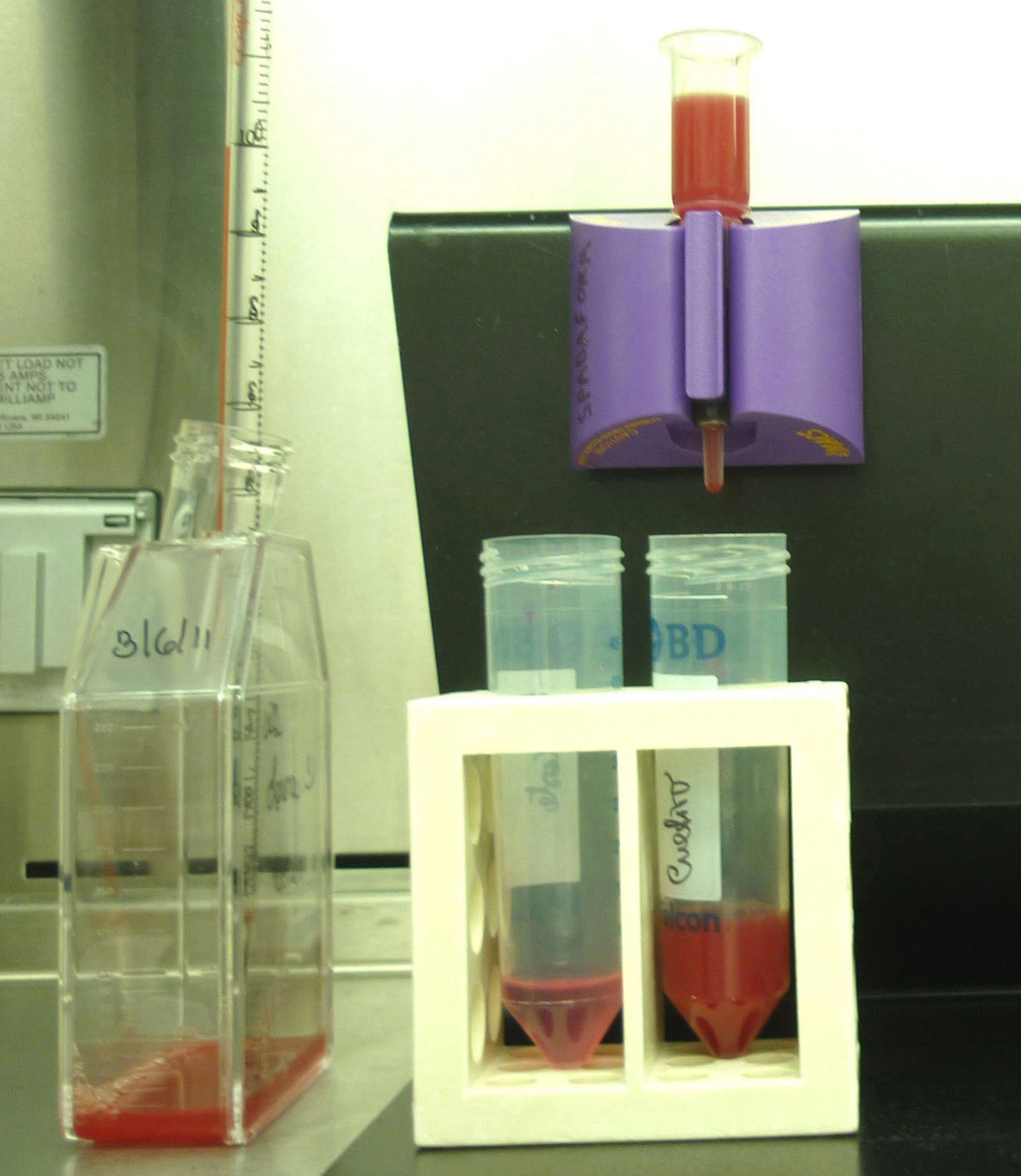
Magnetic collection of P.falciparum infected blood

To achieve synchronization and/or concentration of the parasites in culture several methods have been developed. A discontinuous Percoll gradient procedure can be used to isolate infected red blood cells because red cells containing plasmodia are less dense than normal ones. Young trophozoites coincided with erythrocytes in a broad band corresponding to densities from 1.075 to 1.100 g/ml, whereas schizonts were concentrated at a density approximating 1.062 g/ml. There are studies, however, that suggest that some strains of P.falciparum are affected in their capacity of invasion after being exposed to this chemical. The difference between diamagnetic low-spin oxyhemoglobin in uninfected red blood cells and paramagnetic hemozoin in infected red blood cells can also be used for isolation. Magnetic columns have shown to be less harmful for the parasite and are simple and adjustable to the needs of the researcher. The column is mounted in a potent magnet holder and the culture flowed through it. The column traps the erythrocytes infected with the latest stages of the parasites, which can then be eluted when the column is removed from the magnet. It is a simple method that does not need expensive equipment and it does not seem to affect the parasites as to their invasion capabilities afterwards.
