= Biocrystallization =

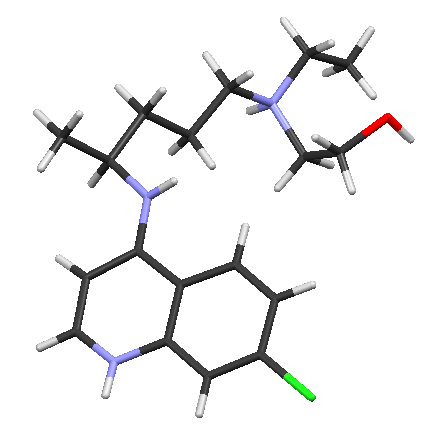
The biocrystallization inhibitor chloroquine was developed in Germany in the 1930s. For 20 years Chloroquine was a "magic bullet".

Biocrystallization is the formation of crystals from organic macromolecules by living organisms. This may be a stress response, a normal part of metabolism such as processes that dispose of waste compounds, or a pathology. Template mediated crystallization is qualitatively different from in vitro crystallization. Inhibitors of biocrystallization are of interest in drug design efforts against lithiasis and against pathogens that feed on blood, since many of these organisms use this process to safely dispose of heme.

== DNA ==
Under severe stress conditions the bacteria Escherichia coli protects its DNA from damage by sequestering it within a crystalline structure. This process is mediated by the stress response protein Dps and allows the bacteria to survive varied assaults such as oxidative stress, heat shock, ultraviolet light, gamma radiation and extremes of pH.

== Heme ==
Blood feeding organisms digest hemoglobin and release high quantities of free toxic heme. To avoid destruction by this molecule, the parasite biocrystallizes heme to form hemozoin. To date, the only definitively characterized product of hematin disposal is the pigment hemozoin. Hemozoin is per definitionem not a mineral and therefore not formed by biomineralization. Heme biocrystallization has been found in blood feeding organisms of great medical importance including Plasmodium, Rhodnius and Schistosoma. Heme biocrystallization is inhibited by quinoline antimalarials such as chloroquine.

Targeting heme biocrystallization remains one of the most promising avenues for antimalarial drug development because the drug target is highly specific to the malarial parasite, and outside the genetic control of the parasite.

== Lithiasis ==
Lithiasis (formation of stones) is a global human health problem. Stones can form in both urinary and gastrointestinal tracts. Related to the formation of stones is the formation of crystals; this can occur in joints (e.g. gout) and in the viscera.

== See also ==
- Biomineralization
- Diatomaceous earth
- Magnetotactic bacteria
- Prion
