= Hypoxanthine =

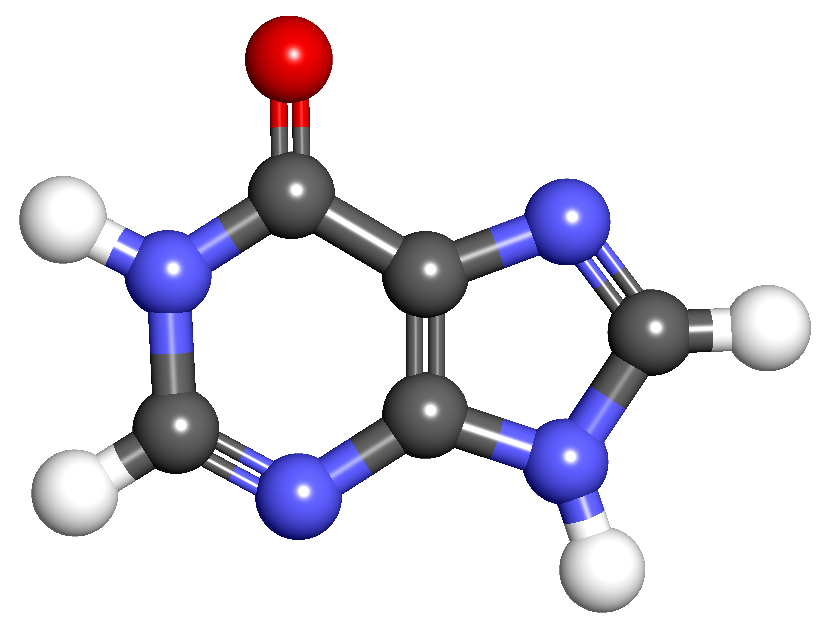

Names
- Preferred IUPAC name 1,9-Dihydro-6H-purin-6-one

Identifiers
CAS Number	68-94-0
3D model (JSmol)	Interactive image
ChEBI	CHEBI:17368
ChEMBL	ChEMBL1427
ChemSpider	768
ECHA InfoCard	100.000.634
IUPHAR/BPS	4555
KEGG	C00262
MeSH	Hypoxanthine
PubChem CID	790
UNII	2TN51YD919
CompTox Dashboard (EPA)	DTXSID8045983
- InChI: InChI=1S/C5H4N4O/c10-5-3-4(7-1-6-3)8-2-9-5/h1-2H,(H2,6,7,8,9,10) Key: FDGQSTZJBFJUBT-UHFFFAOYSA-N; InChI=1/C5H4N4O/c10-5-3-4(7-1-6-3)8-2-9-5/h1-2H,(H2,6,7,8,9,10) Key: FDGQSTZJBFJUBT-UHFFFAOYAJ
- SMILES: c1[nH]c2c(n1)[nH]cnc2=O

Properties
Chemical formula	C_{5}H_{4}N_{4}O
Molar mass	136.112
- Except where otherwise noted, data are given for materials in their standard state (at 25 °C [77 °F], 100 kPa). verify (what is ?) Infobox references

Hypoxanthine is a naturally occurring purine derivative. It is occasionally found as a constituent of nucleic acids, where it is present in the anticodon of tRNA in the form of its nucleoside inosine. It has a tautomer known as 6-hydroxypurine. Hypoxanthine is a necessary additive in certain cells, bacteria, and parasite cultures as a substrate and nitrogen source. For example, it is commonly a required reagent in malaria parasite cultures, since Plasmodium falciparum requires a source of hypoxanthine for nucleic acid synthesis and energy metabolism.

In August 2011, a report, based on NASA studies with meteorites found on Earth, was published suggesting hypoxanthine and related organic molecules, including the bases of the DNA and RNA components adenine and guanine, which were found in trace amounts in meteorites, may have been formed by reactions occurring extraterrestrially in outer space.

The Pheretima aspergillum worm, used in Chinese medicine preparations, contains hypoxanthine.

== Reactions ==
It is one of the products of the action of xanthine oxidase on xanthine. However, more frequently in purine degradation, xanthine is formed from oxidation of hypoxanthine by xanthine oxidoreductase.

Hypoxanthine-guanine phosphoribosyltransferase converts hypoxanthine into IMP in nucleotide salvage.

Hypoxanthine is also a spontaneous deamination product of adenine. Because of its resemblance to guanine, the spontaneous deamination of adenine can lead to an error in DNA transcription/replication, as it base pairs with cytosine. Hypoxanthine is removed from DNA by base excision repair, initiated by N-methylpurine glycosylase (MPG), also known as alkyl adenine glycosylase (Aag).

== Additional images ==
Adenine

Guanine

Xanthine
