= Hemozoin =

Crystalline waste product of parasitic blood digestion

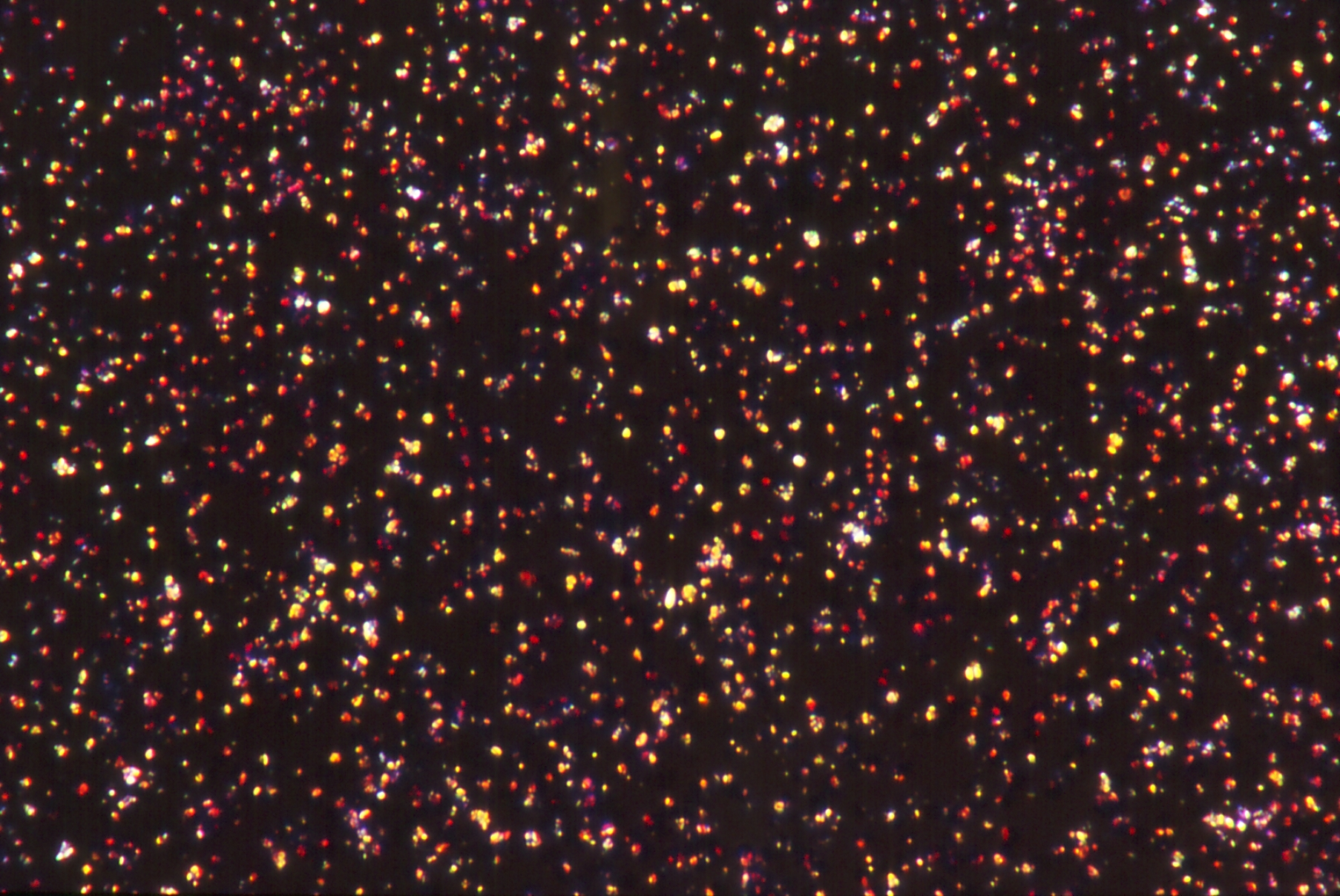
Plasmodium falciparum hemozoin crystals under polarised light.

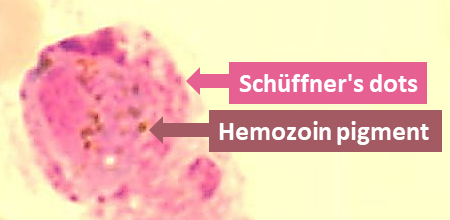
Plasmodium ovale microgametocyte in Giemsa-stained thin blood film, with annotated Schüffner's dots and hemozoin pigment.

Haemozoin is a disposal product formed from the digestion of blood by some blood-feeding parasites. These hematophagous organisms such as malaria parasites (Plasmodium spp.), Rhodnius and Schistosoma digest haemoglobin and release high quantities of free heme, which is the non-protein component of haemoglobin. Heme is a prosthetic group consisting of an iron atom contained in the center of a heterocyclic porphyrin ring. Free heme is toxic to cells, so the parasites convert it into an insoluble crystalline form called hemozoin. In malaria parasites, hemozoin is often called malaria pigment.

Since the formation of hemozoin is essential to the survival of these parasites, it is an attractive target for developing drugs. It is much-studied in Plasmodium as a way to find drugs to treat malaria (malaria's Achilles' heel). Several currently used antimalarial drugs, such as chloroquine and mefloquine, are thought to kill malaria parasites by inhibiting haemozoin biocrystallization.

== Discovery ==
Black-brown pigment was observed by Johann Heinrich Meckel in 1847, in the blood and spleen of a person suffering from insanity. However, it was not until 1849 that the presence of this pigment was connected to infection with malaria. Initially, it was thought that this pigment was produced by the body in response to infection, but Charles Louis Alphonse Laveran realized in 1880 that "malaria pigment" is, instead, produced by the parasites, as they multiplied within the red blood cell. The link between pigment and malaria parasites was used by Ronald Ross to identify the stages in the Plasmodium life cycle that occur within the mosquito, since, although these forms of the parasite are different in appearance to the blood stages, they still contain traces of pigment.

Later, in 1891, T. Carbone and W.H. Brown (1911) published papers linking the hemoglobin degradation with pigment production, describing the malaria pigment as a form of hematin and disproving the widely held idea that it is related to melanin. Brown observed that all melanins were bleaching rapidly with potassium permanganate, while with this reagent malarial pigment manifests not the slightest sign of a true bleach reaction. The name "hemozoin" was proposed by Louis Westenra Sambon. In the 1930s several authors identified hemozoin as a pure crystalline form of α-hematin and showed that the substance did not contain proteins within the crystals, but no explanation for the solubility differences between malaria pigment and α-hematin crystals was given.

== Formation ==
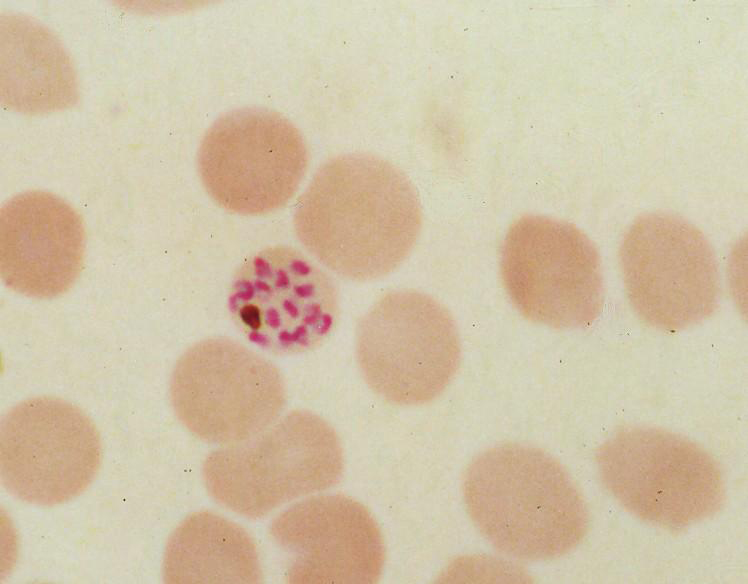
Human red blood cell infected by the malaria parasite Plasmodium falciparum, showing a residual body with brown hemozoin.

During its intraerythrocytic asexual reproduction cycle Plasmodium falciparum consumes up to 80% of the host cell hemoglobin. The digestion of hemoglobin releases monomeric α-hematin (ferriprotoporphyrin IX). This compound is toxic, since it is a pro-oxidant and catalyzes the production of reactive oxygen species. Oxidative stress is believed to be generated during the conversion of heme (ferroprotoporphyrin) to hematin (ferriprotoporphyrin). Free hematin can also bind to and disrupt cell membranes, damaging cell structures and causing the lysis of the host erythrocyte. The unique reactivity of this molecule has been demonstrated in several in vitro and in vivo experimental conditions.

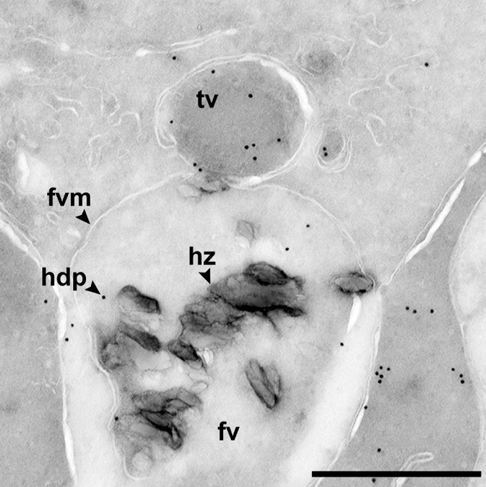
Transport vesicle delivering a heme detoxification protein (hdp) to a malaria food vacuole (fv) containing crystals of hemozoin (hz). Scale bar is 0.5 μm.

The malaria parasite, therefore, detoxifies the hematin, which it does by biocrystallization—converting it into insoluble and chemically inert β-hematin crystals (called hemozoin). In Plasmodium the food vacuole fills with hemozoin crystals, which are about 100–200 nanometres long and each contain about 80,000 heme molecules. Detoxification through biocrystallization is distinct from the detoxification process in mammals, where an enzyme called heme oxygenase instead breaks excess heme into biliverdin, iron, and carbon monoxide.

Several mechanisms have been proposed for the production of hemozoin in Plasmodium, and the area is highly controversial, with membrane lipids, histidine-rich proteins, or even a combination of the two, being proposed to catalyse the formation of hemozoin. Other authors have described a heme detoxification protein, which is claimed to be more potent than either lipids or histidine-rich proteins. It is possible that many processes contribute to the formation of hemozoin. The formation of hemozoin in other blood-feeding organisms is not as well-studied as in Plasmodium. However, studies on Schistosoma mansoni have revealed that this parasitic worm produces large amounts of hemozoin during its growth in the human bloodstream. Although the shapes of the crystals are different from those produced by malaria parasites, chemical analysis of the pigment showed that it is made of hemozoin. In a similar manner, the crystals formed in the gut of the kissing bug Rhodnius prolixus during digestion of the blood meal also have a unique shape, but are composed of hemozoin. Hz formation in R. prolixus midgut occurs at physiologically relevant physico-chemical conditions and lipids play an important role in heme biocrystallization. Autocatalytic heme crystallization to Hz is revealed to be an inefficient process and this conversion is further reduced as the Hz concentration increases.

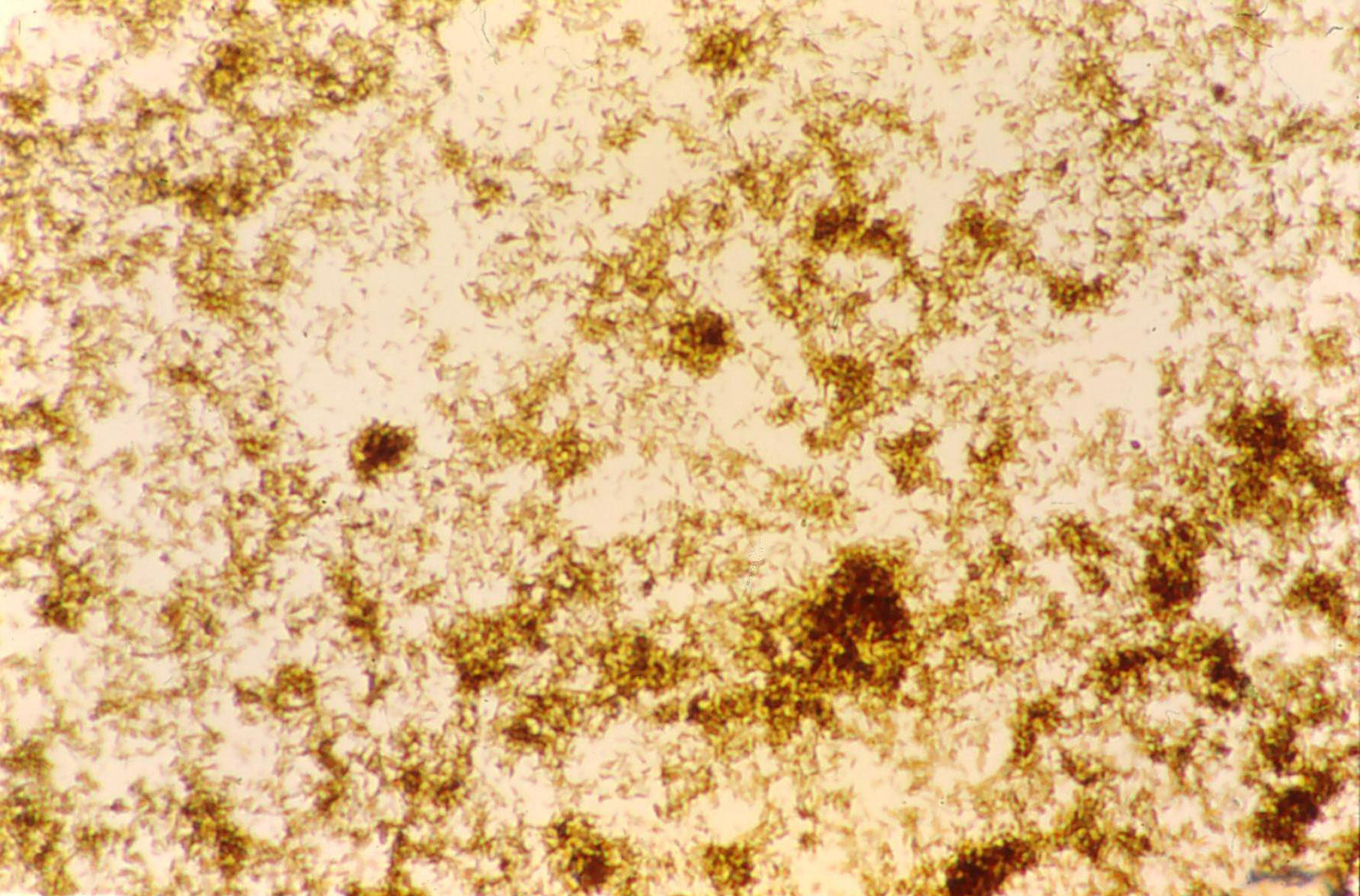
Isolated P. falciparum hemozoin

Several other mechanisms have been developed to protect a large variety of hematophagous organisms against the toxic effects of free heme. Mosquitoes digest their blood meals extracellularly and do not produce hemozoin. Heme is retained in the peritrophic matrix, a layer of protein and polysaccharides that covers the midgut and separates gut cells from the blood bolus.

Although β-hematin can be produced in assays spontaneously at low pH, the development of a simple and reliable method to measure the production of hemozoin has been difficult. This is in part due to the continued uncertainty over what molecules are involved in producing hemozoin, and partly from the difficulty in measuring the difference between aggregated or precipitated heme, and genuine hemozoin. Current assays are sensitive and accurate, but require multiple washing steps so are slow and not ideal for high-throughput screening. However, some screens have been performed with these assays.

== Structure ==
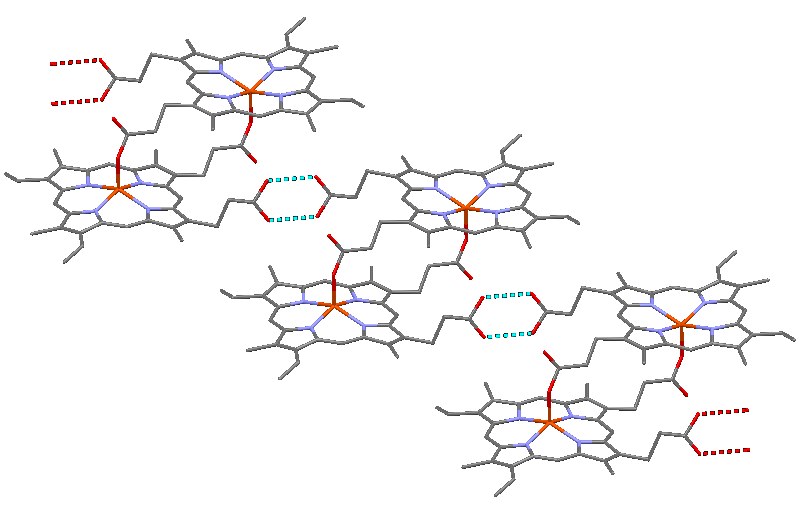
Structure of hemozoin, showing hydrogen bonds between hematin units as dotted lines, and coordinate bonds between iron atoms and carboxylate side chains as red lines

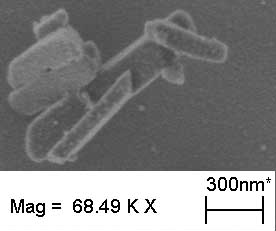
Electron micrograph of crystals of hemozoin isolated from the malaria parasite Plasmodium falciparum. Magnified 68,490 times. Hemozoin is produced by template mediated crystallization ("biocrystallization").

β-Hematin crystals are made of dimers of hematin molecules that are, in turn, joined together by hydrogen bonds to form larger structures. In these dimers, an iron-oxygen coordinate bond links the central iron of one hematin to the oxygen of the carboxylate side-chain of the adjacent hematin. These reciprocal iron–oxygen bonds are highly unusual and have not been observed in any other porphyrin dimer. β-Hematin can be either a cyclic dimer or a linear polymer, a polymeric form has never been found in hemozoin, disproving the widely held idea that hemozoin is produced by the enzyme heme-polymerase.

Hemozoin crystals have a distinct triclinic structure and are weakly magnetic. The difference between diamagnetic low-spin oxyhemoglobin and paramagnetic hemozoin can be used for isolation. They also exhibit optical dichroism, meaning they absorb light more strongly along their length than across their width, enabling the automated detection of malaria. Hemozoin is produced in a form that, under the action of an applied magnetic field, gives rise to an induced optical dichroism characteristic of the hemozoin concentration; and precise measurement of this induced dichroism (Magnetic circular dichroism) may be used to determine the level of malarial infection.

== Inhibitors ==
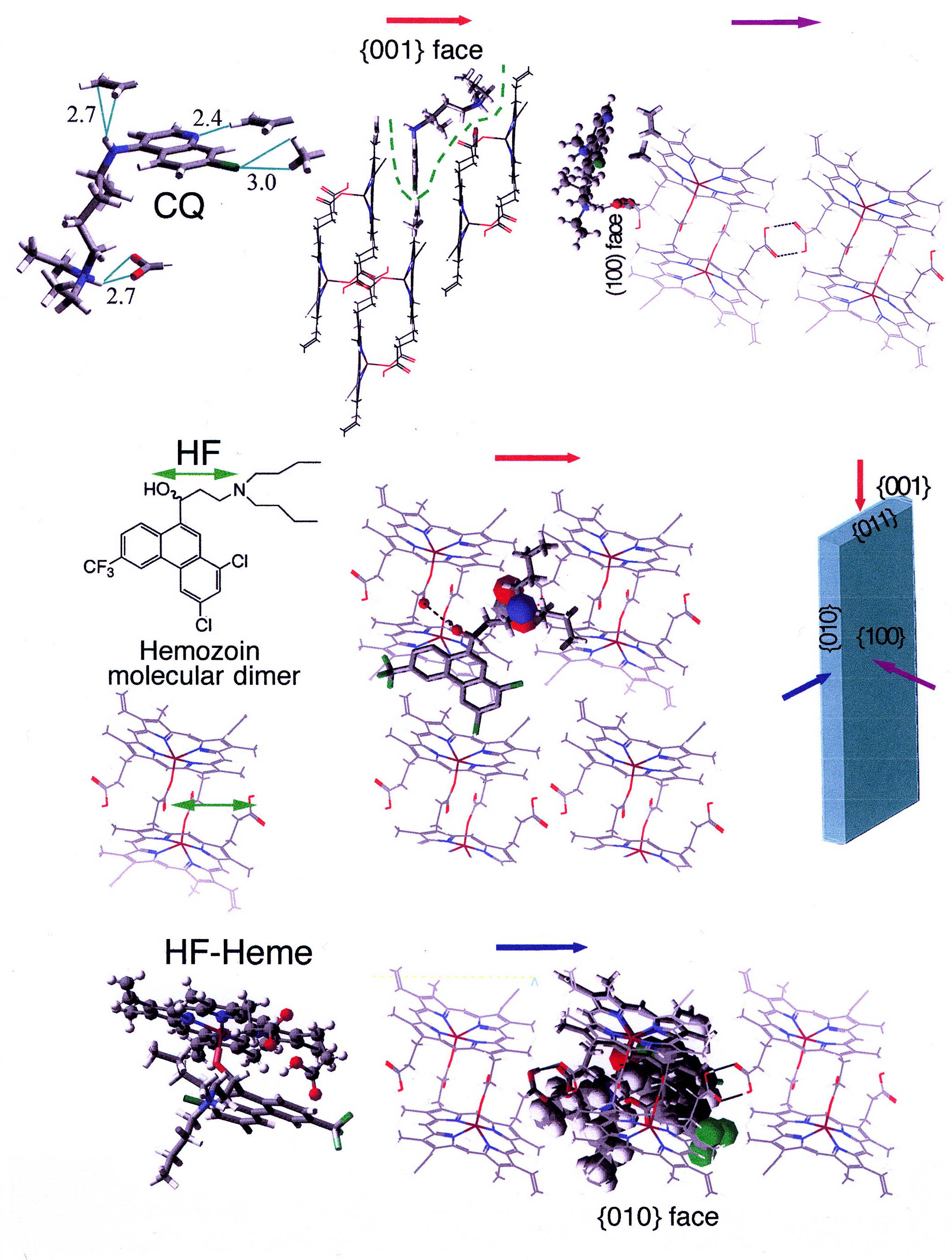
Drug heme interaction

Hemozoin formation is an excellent drug target, since it is essential to malaria parasite survival and absent from the human host. The drug target hematin is host-derived and largely outside the genetic control of the parasite, which makes the development of drug resistance more difficult. Many clinically used drugs are thought to act by inhibiting the formation of hemozoin in the food vacuole. This prevents the detoxification of the heme released in this compartment, and kills the parasite.

The best-understood examples of such hematin biocrystallization inhibitors are quinoline drugs such as chloroquine and mefloquine. These drugs bind to both free heme and hemozoin crystals, and therefore block the addition of new heme units onto the growing crystals. The small, most rapidly growing face is the face to which inhibitors are believed to bind.

== Role in pathophysiology ==
Hemozoin is released into the circulation during reinfection and phagocytosed in vivo and in vitro by host phagocytes and alters important functions in those cells. Most functional alterations were long-term postphagocytic effects, including erythropoiesis inhibition shown in vitro. In contrast, a powerful, short-term stimulation of oxidative burst by human monocytes was also shown to occur during phagocytosis of nHZ. Lipid peroxidation non-enzymatically catalysed by hemozoin iron was described in immune cells. Lipoperoxidation products, as hydroxyeicosatetraenoic acids (HETEs) and 4-hydroxynonenal (4-HNE), are functionally involved in immunomodulation.

== See also ==
- Biocrystallization
- Drug discovery
- History of malaria
- Parasitic diseases
