= C19H22N2O =

The molecular formula C_{19}H_{22}N_{2}O (molar mass: 294.398 g/mol) may refer to:

- Amedalin
- AQW-051
- Benanserin
- BGC20-761
- Cinchonidine
- Cinchonine
- Ketipramine
- Normacusine B
- Noxiptiline
- Rhazinilam
- Tombozine
- Vinburnine (Eburnamonine)
