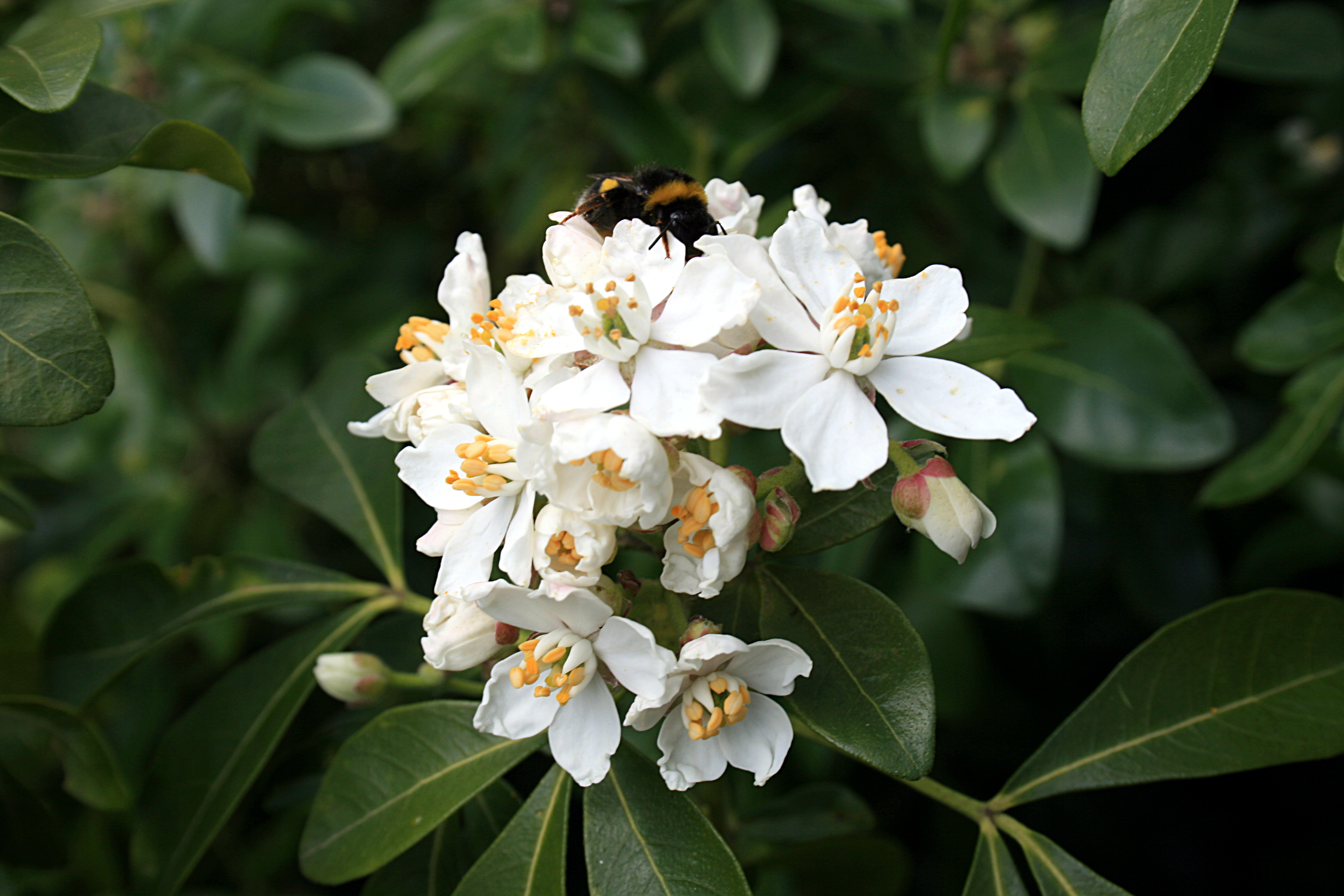
- Choisya ternata

Scientific classification
- Kingdom: Plantae
- Clade: Embryophytes
- Clade: Tracheophytes
- Clade: Angiosperms
- Clade: Eudicots
- Clade: Rosids
- Order: Sapindales
- Family: Rutaceae
- Subfamily: Zanthoxyloideae
- Genus: Choisya; Kunth

Species
- See text

Synonyms
- Astrophyllum Torr. & A.Gray

= Choisya =

Genus of flowering plants

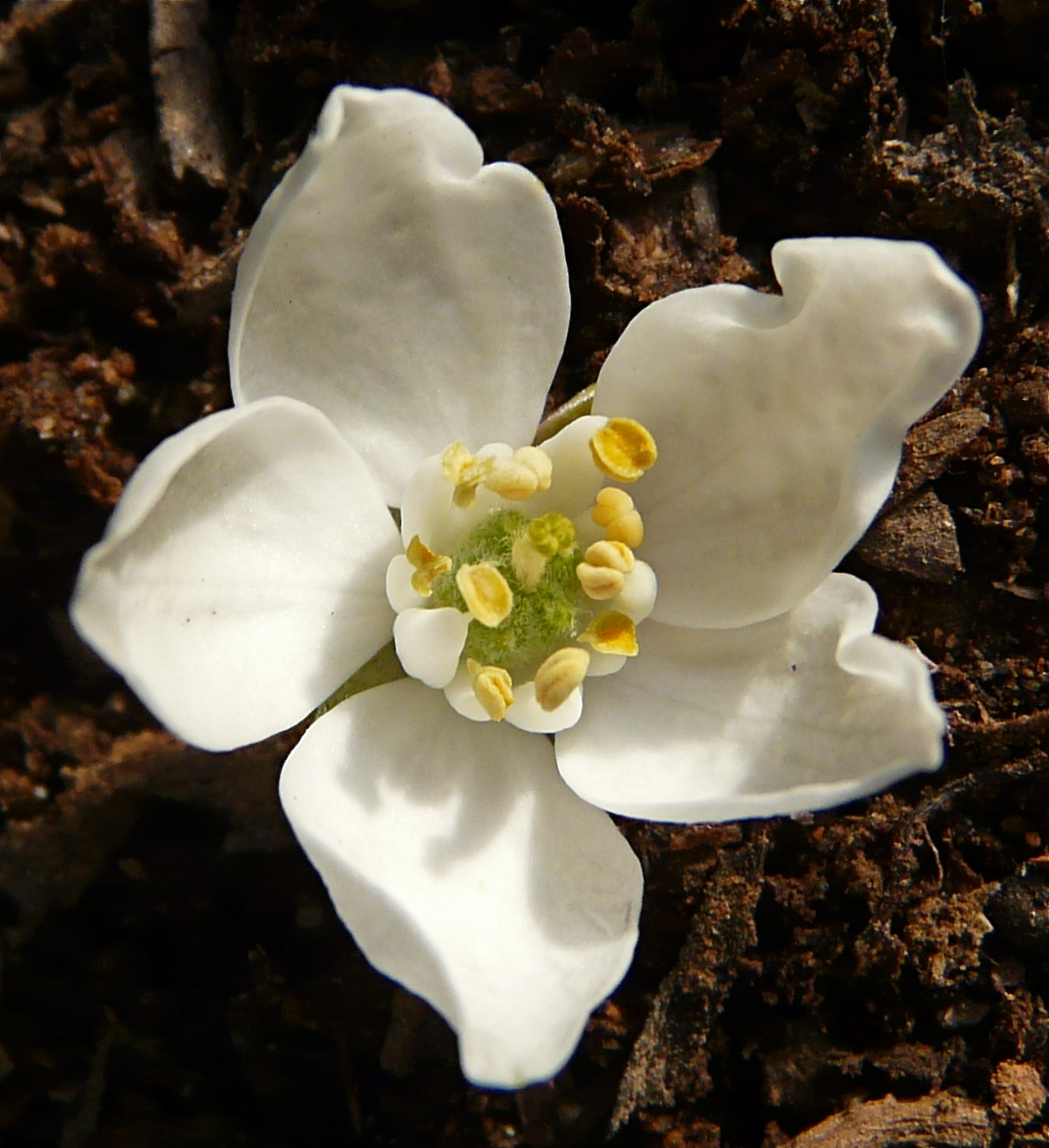

Choisya /ˈʃɔɪziə/ is a small genus of aromatic evergreen shrubs in the rue family, Rutaceae. Members of the genus are commonly known as Mexican orange due to the similarity of their flowers to those of the closely related orange, both in shape and scent. They are native to southern North America, from Arizona, New Mexico, Texas and south through most of Mexico. In its generic name Humboldt and Bonpland honoured Swiss botanist Jacques Denis Choisy (1799–1859).

== Description ==
The species grow to 1–3 m (3.3–9.8 ft) tall. The leaves are opposite, leathery, glossy, palmately compound with 3-13 leaflets, each leaflet 3–8 cm (1.2–3.1 in) long and 0.5–3.5 cm (0.20–1.38 in) broad. C. ternata has three broad leaflets, while C. dumosa has up to 13 very narrow leaflets. The flowers are star-shaped, 3–5 cm (1.2–2.0 in) diameter, with 4-7 white petals, 8-15 stamens and a green stigma; they are produced throughout the late spring and summer. The fruit is a leathery two to six sectioned capsule.

== Uses ==
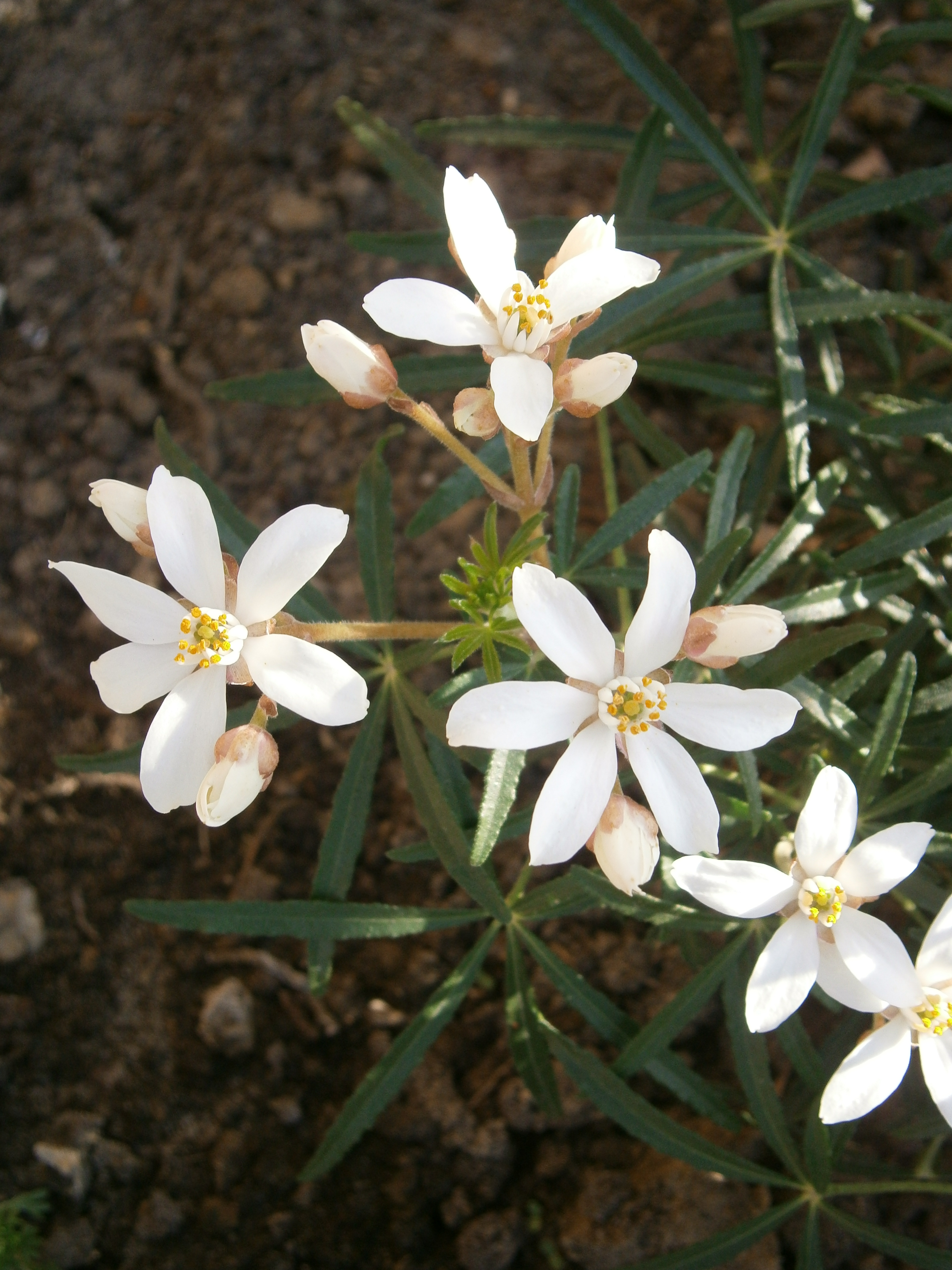
Choisya 'Aztec Pearl'

Choisya species are popular ornamental plants in areas with mild winters, grown primarily for their abundant and fragrant flowers. The foliage is also aromatic, smelling of rue when bruised or cut. The flowers are also valued for honeybee forage, producing abundant nectar.

The following cultivars have gained the Royal Horticultural Society's Award of Garden Merit:-

- Choisya × dewitteana 'Aztec Pearl'
- Choisya × dewitteana White Dazzler = 'Londaz'
- Choisya ternata
- Choisya ternata Sundance = 'Lich' bred by Peter Catt (1986).

== Chemistry ==
Many quinoline alkaloids have been isolated from leaves of Choisya ternata. C. ternata contains an alkaloid (ternanthranin), a volatile simple anthranilate that can be considered responsible for the antinociceptive activity of the crude plant extracts.

== Species ==
- Choisya dumosa (Torr.) A.Gray (includes C. arizonica) – starleaf
- Choisya katherinae C.H.Müll.
- Choisya neglecta C.H.Müll.
- Choisya palmeri Standl.
- Choisya ternata Kunth – Mexican orange blossom

== Pests and diseases ==
Choisya can be prone to attack by pythium root rot, particularly when propagated and grown in pots for the horticultural trade. In north-west Europe the main pest is snails, which eat the bark of even mature specimens, resulting in minor die-back of branches where ring-barking has occurred.
