= Spiraea japonica var. alpina =

Scientific classification
- Kingdom: Plantae
- Clade: Tracheophytes
- Clade: Angiosperms
- Clade: Eudicots
- Clade: Rosids
- Order: Rosales
- Family: Rosaceae
- Genus: Spiraea
- Species: S. japonica
- Variety: S. j. var. alpina

Trinomial name
- Spiraea japonica var. alpina Maxim.

Variety of plant

Spiraea japonica var. alpina, also known as the alpine spirea or daphne spirea, is a low-growing, rounded, deciduous shrub that has pink flowers in flat-topped clusters in late spring to mid summer. The leaves are small, oval, sharply toothed, and blue green-colored. In the fall they turn red and orange.

The shrub grows to a height of .75 to 1 foot (0.23 to 0.30 m), with a spread of 1 to 3 feet (0.30 to 0.91 m). They are native to Japan but grow in USDA hardiness zones 4 through 8.
