= Rosiers–Joseph Migneret Garden =

Space in Paris

Coordinates: 48°51′26″N 2°21′37″E

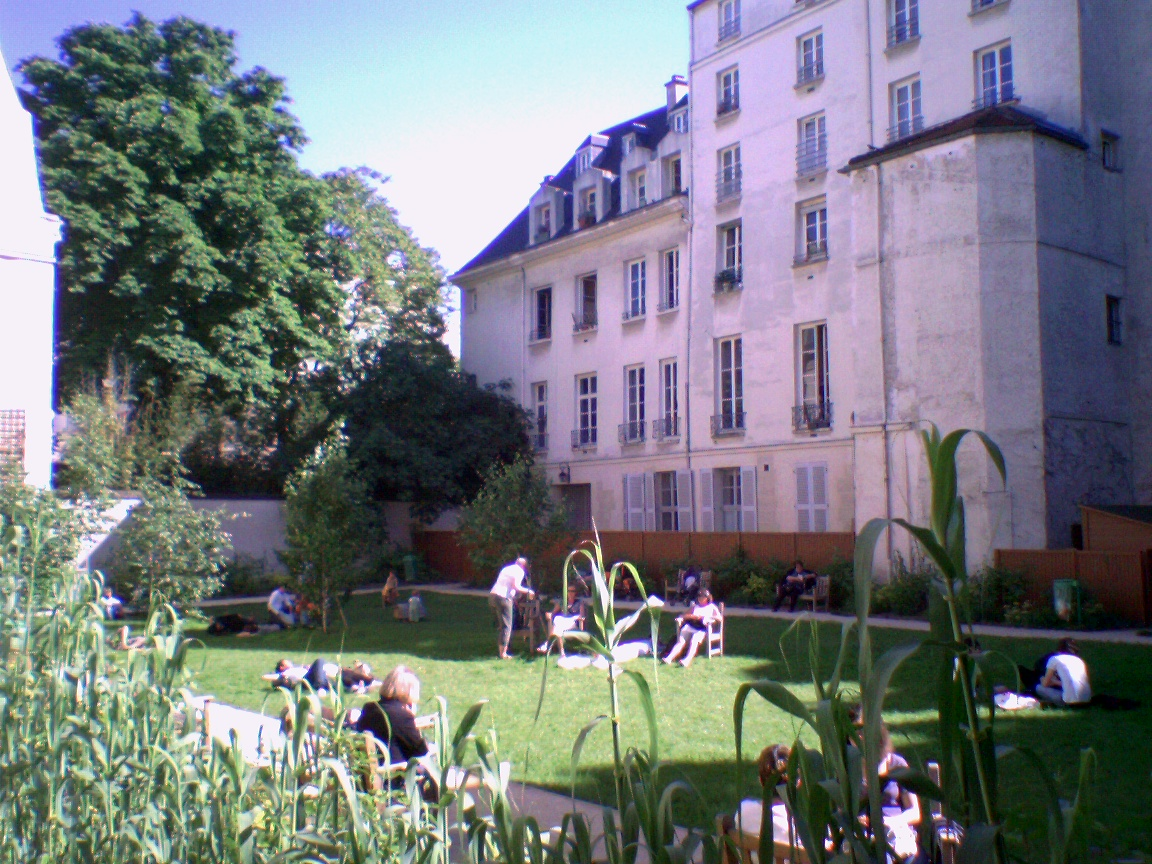
Rosiers–Joseph Migneret Garden

The Rosiers–Joseph Migneret Garden is a green space located in the 4th arrondissement of Paris.

== Location ==
The garden is located between the rue des Francs-Bourgeois and the rue des Rosiers in the heart of the historic quarter of Le Marais. It can be accessed either by the courtyard of the hôtel de Coulanges at 35-37, rue des Francs-Bourgeois, or by number 10, rue des Rosiers.

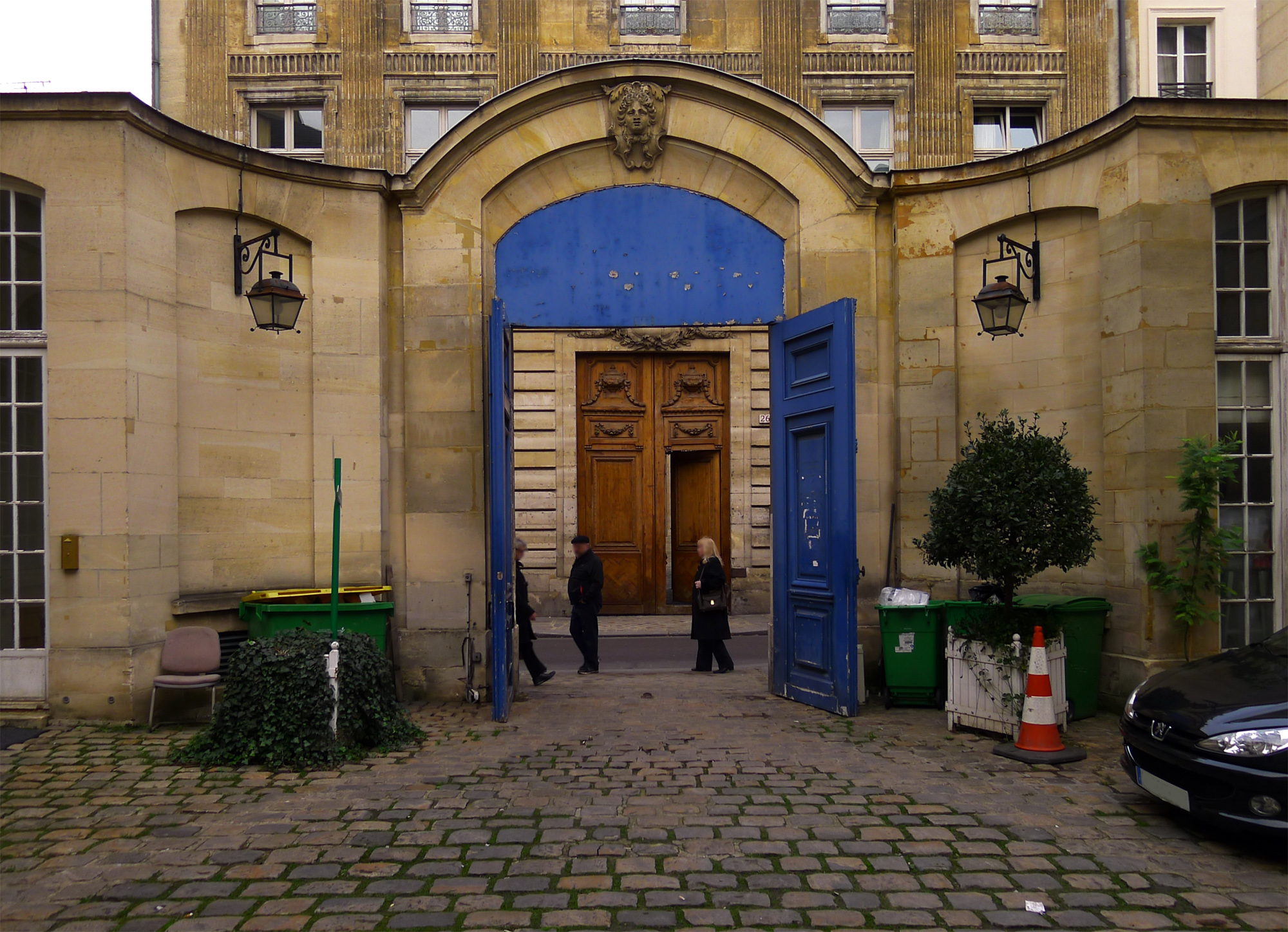
The garden entrance at 35-37 rue des Franc-Bourgeois, Hôtel de Coulanges

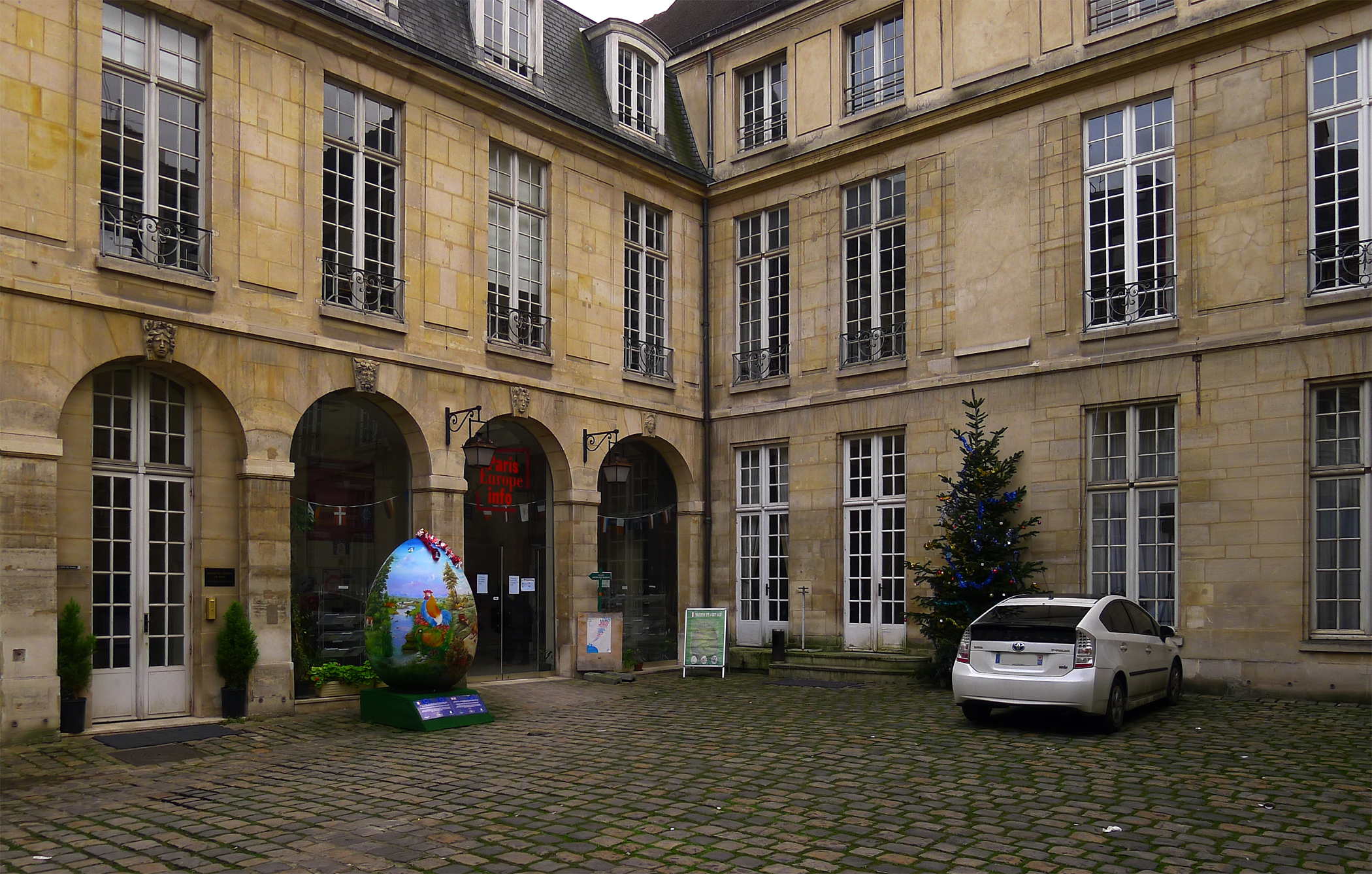
The courtyard of the Hôtel de Coulanges

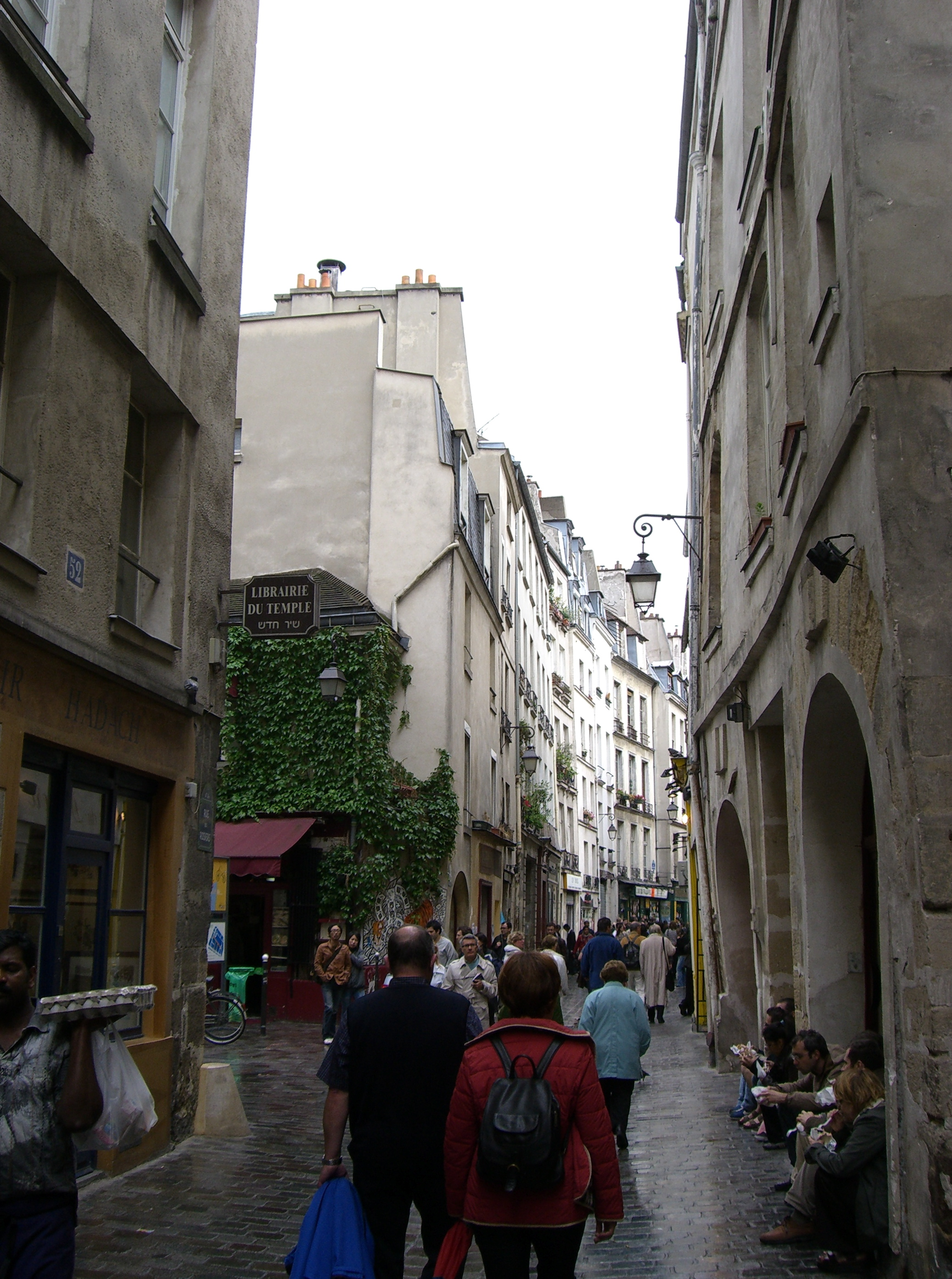
Rue des Rosiers, Le Marais, 75003, Paris

== Origins of the name ==
The garden takes its name after Joseph Migneret, the director of the "École élémentaire des Hospitalières-Saint-Gervais", a boys' school located nearby. During World War II, Migneret showed active resistance by providing false papers to fleeing Jews and sheltering many of his former students, saving them from deportation and death.

== Description ==
With a surface area of 2,135 square metres (22,980 sq ft), the garden was born out of the merging of the private gardens of the mansions that border it: Hôtel de Coulanges, Hôtel Barbes and Hôtel d'Albret. Because of this, the garden is divided into several areas.

The first part of the garden can be accessed through the Hôtel de Coulanges, which today houses the "Maison de l'Europe de Paris"; it consists of a large rectangle of semi-shaded lawn (four birches are planted there) with a children's play area, surrounded by a curtain of wild cane. Different species are planted here: wild lilac, Mexican orange blossom, white dogwood, fescue, fountain grass and feather grass.

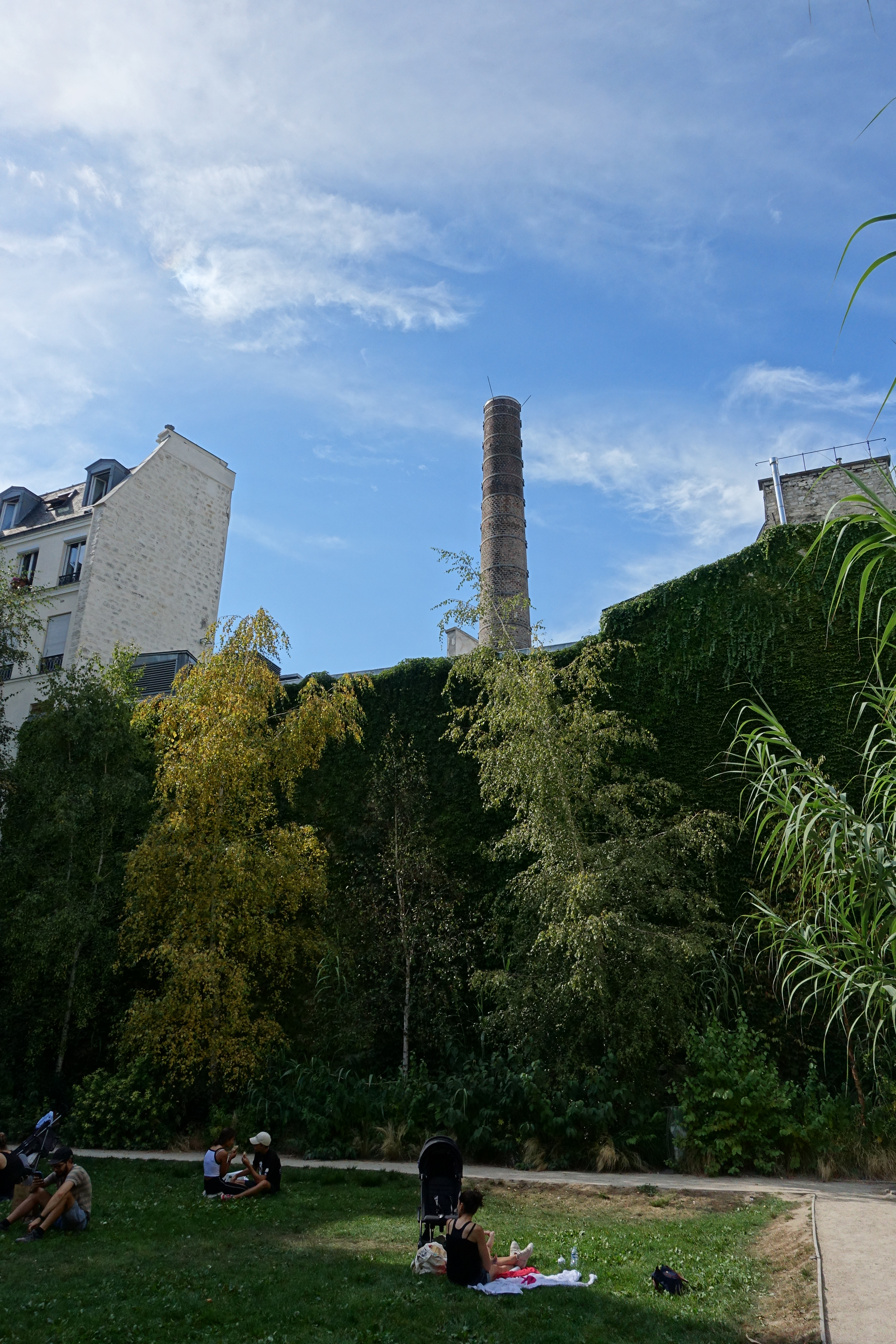
The chimney of "La Société des Cendres"

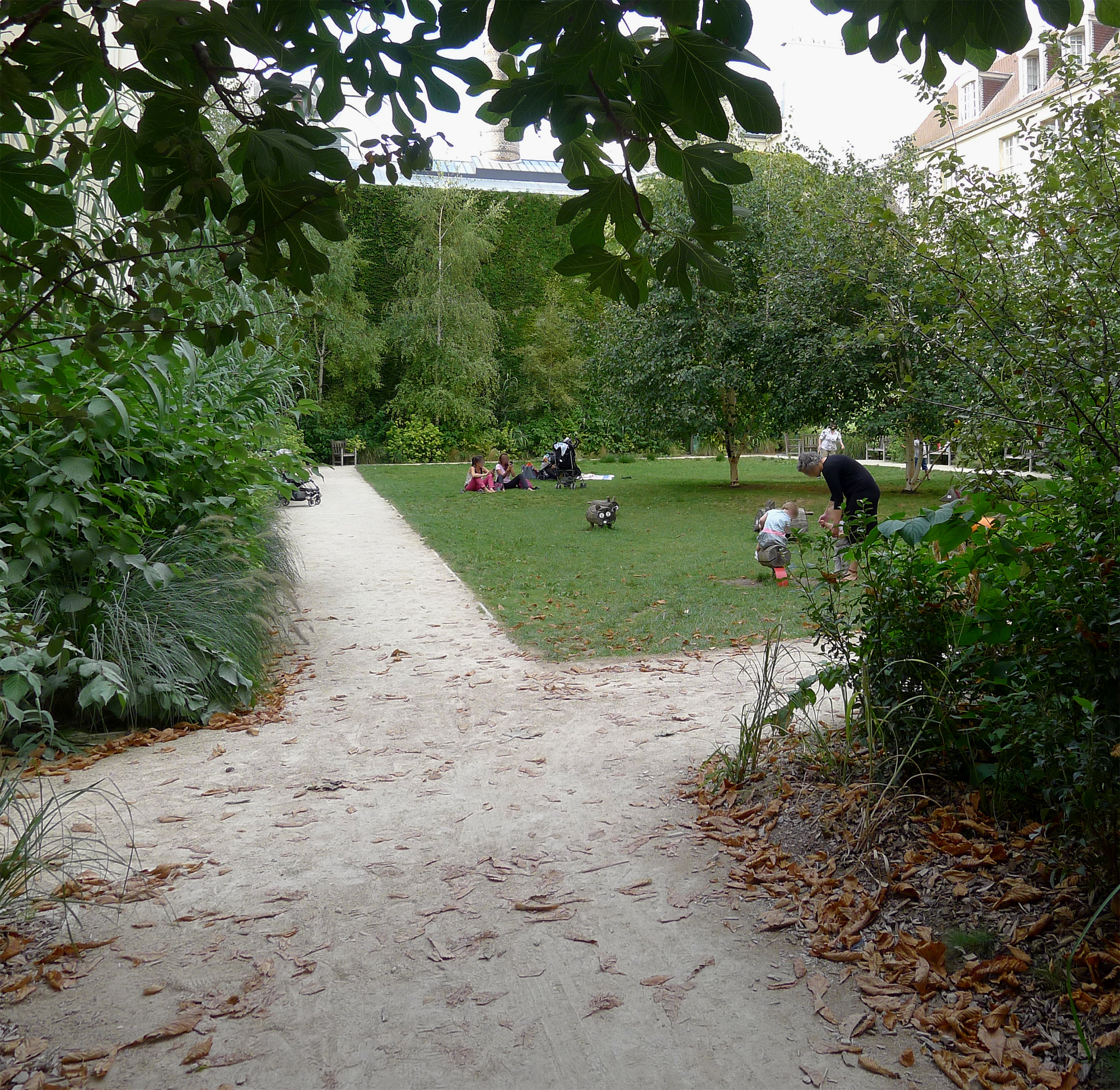
Rosiers–Joseph Migneret Garden

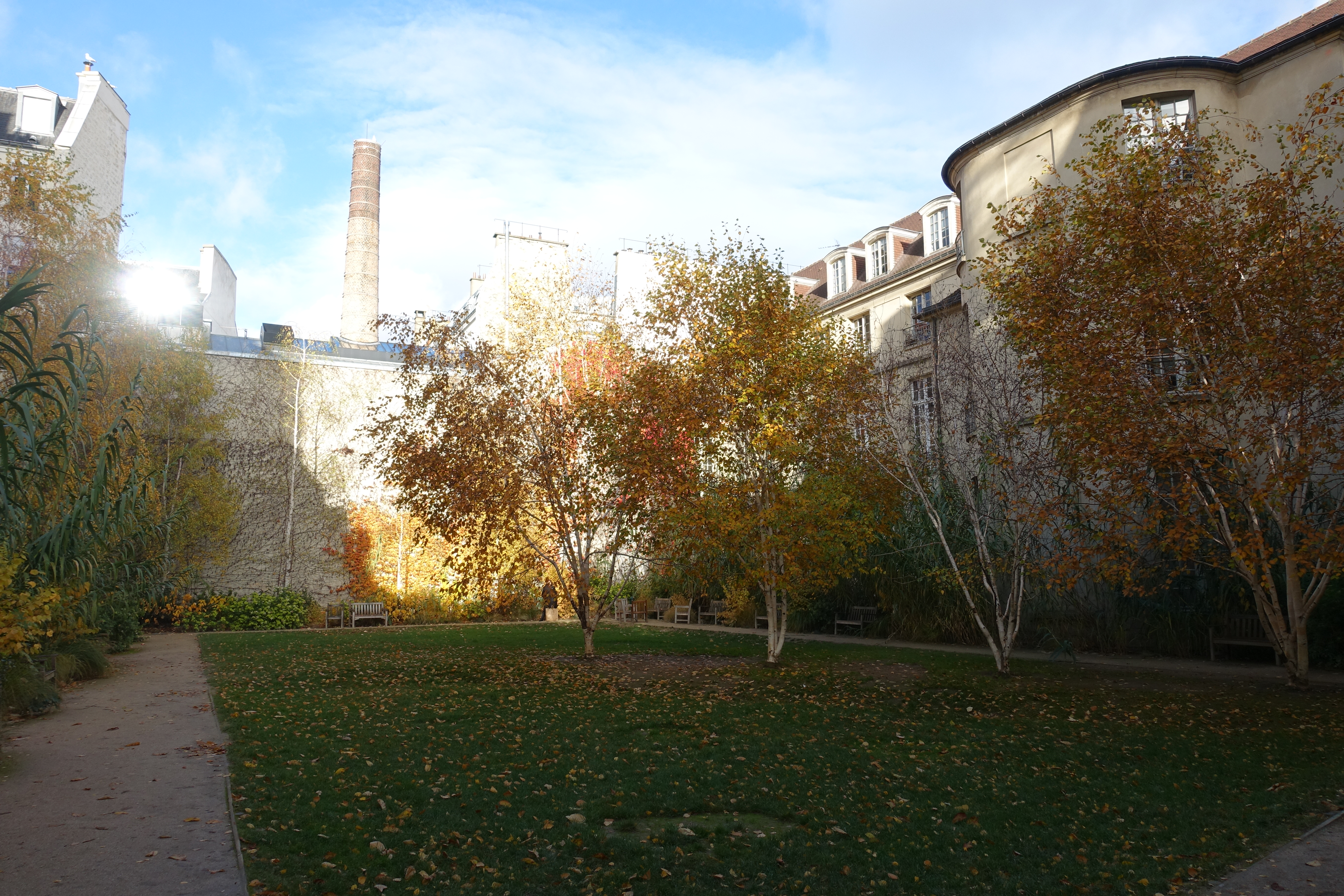
Rosiers–Joseph Migneret Garden

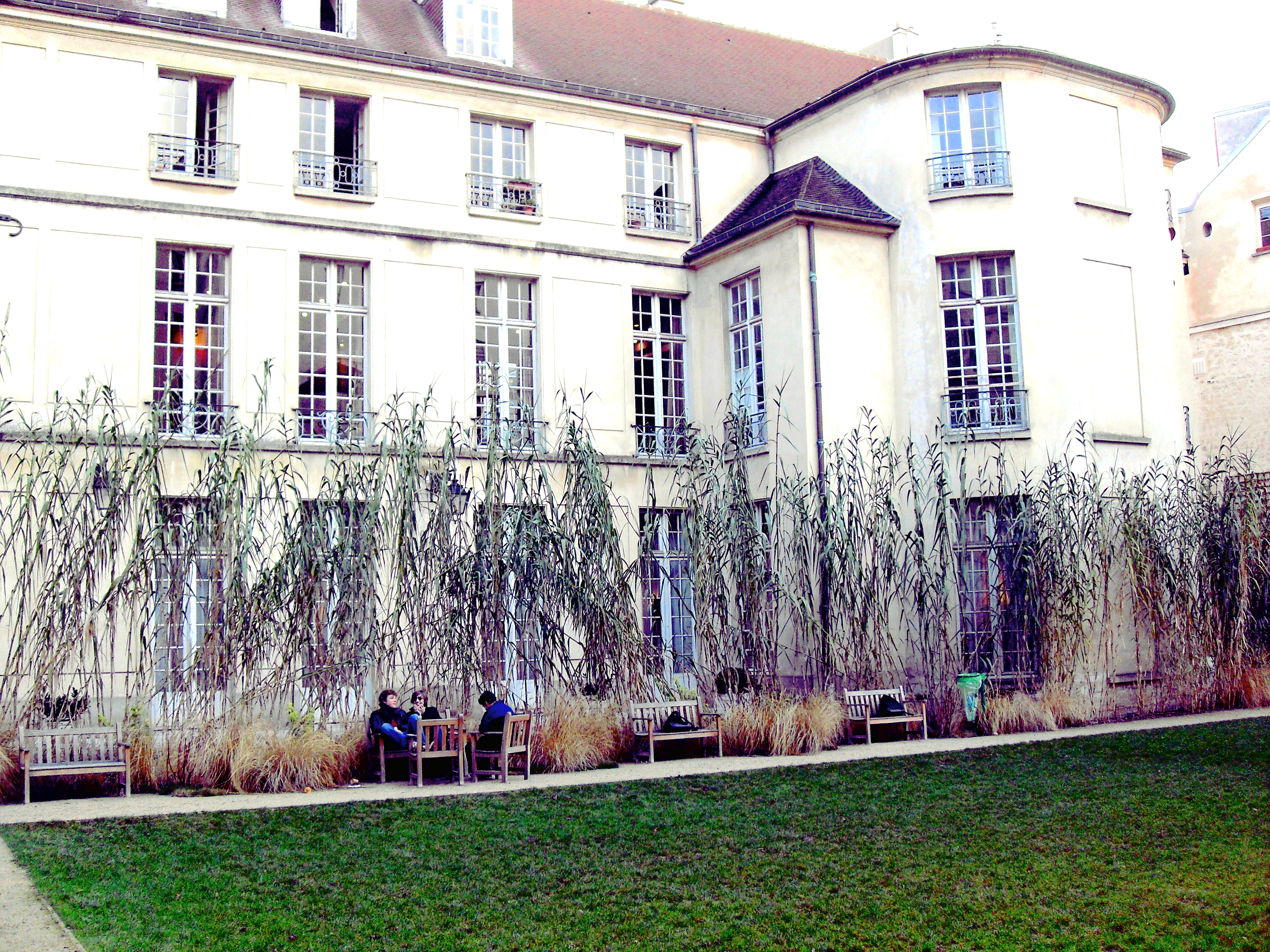
Hôtel de Coulanges

From this point of view a surprising 35 meters high chimney can be observed, which belongs to "La Société des Cendres", which used to process filings and off-cuts of gold and silver left over from workshops.

A second and smaller part of the garden, behind the Hôtel Barbes, shows an inviting dry path between a creeping fig tree and a chestnut tree, along which are a few stopping places with overhanging vegetation.

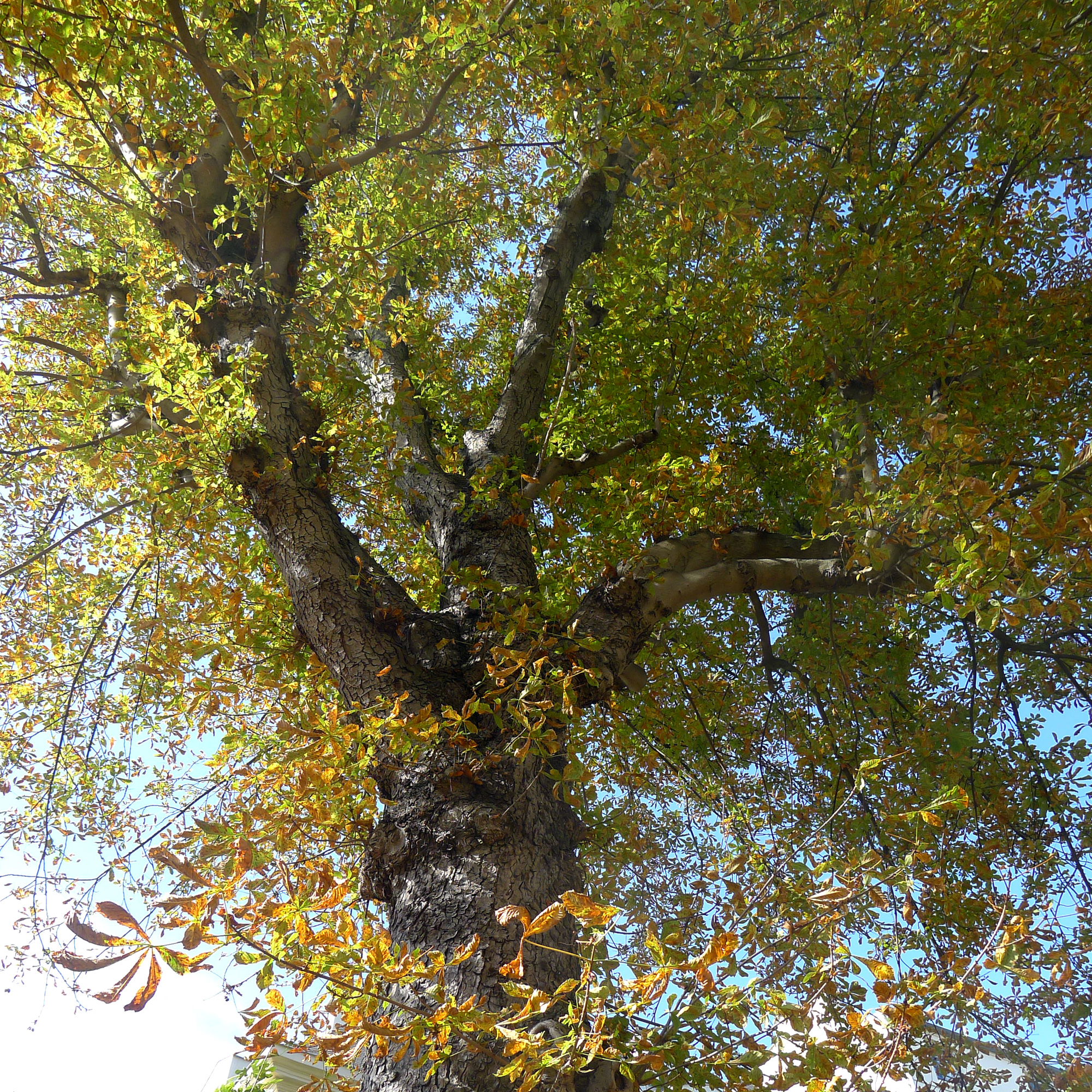
The fig tree

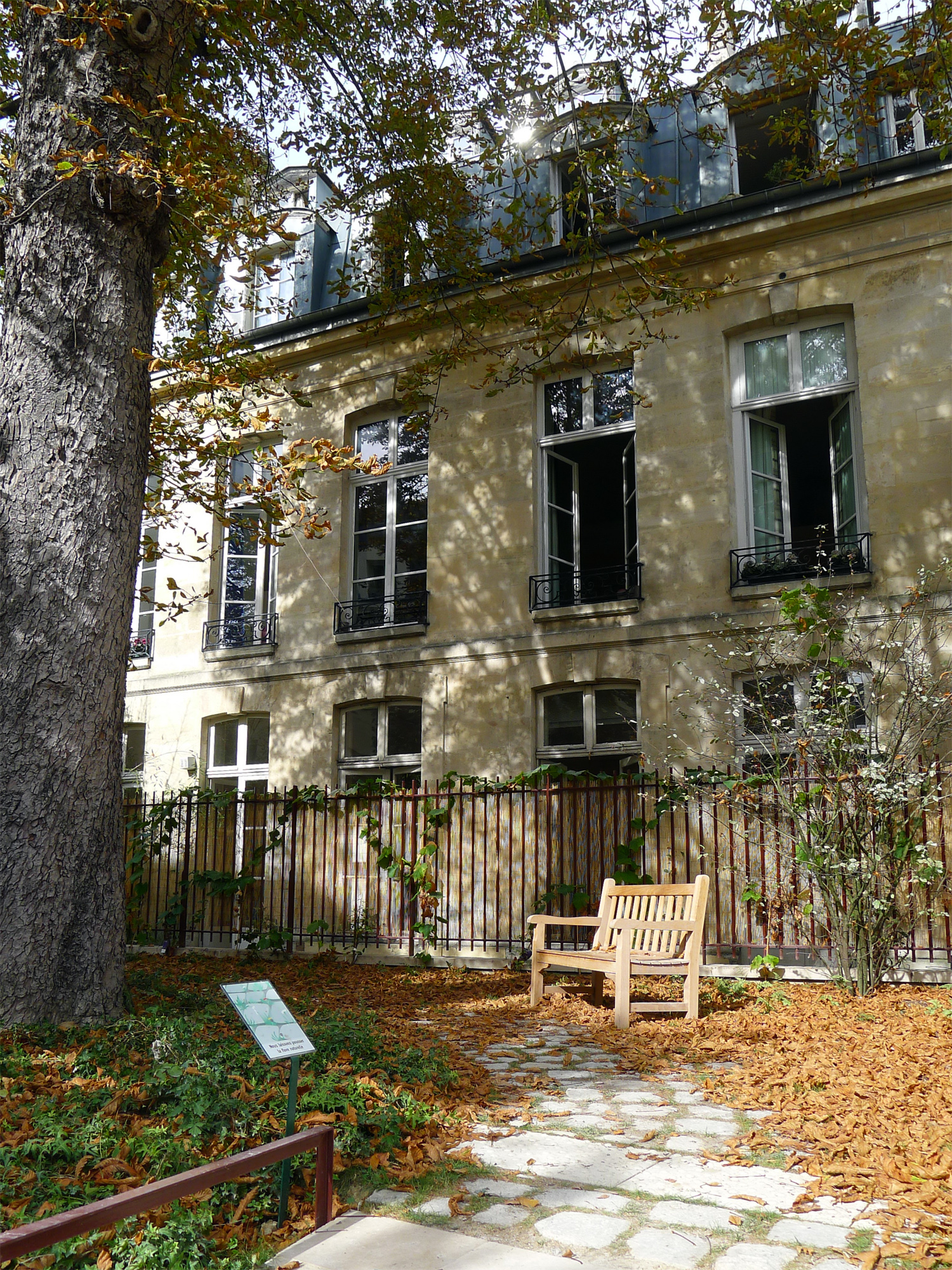
Hôtel Barbes and the sitting area

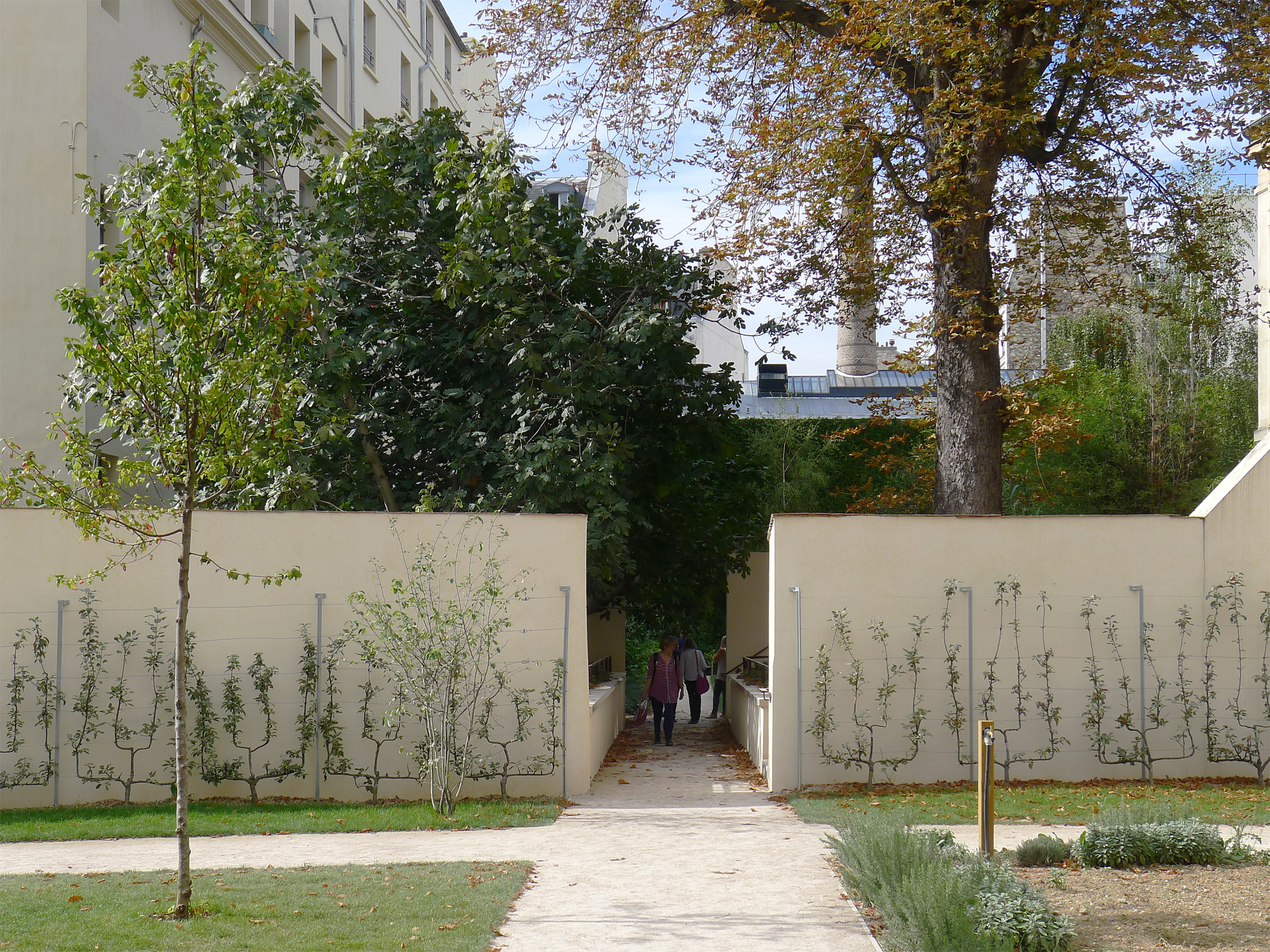
The passage to the Hôtel Barbes as seen from the property of the Hôtel d'Albret

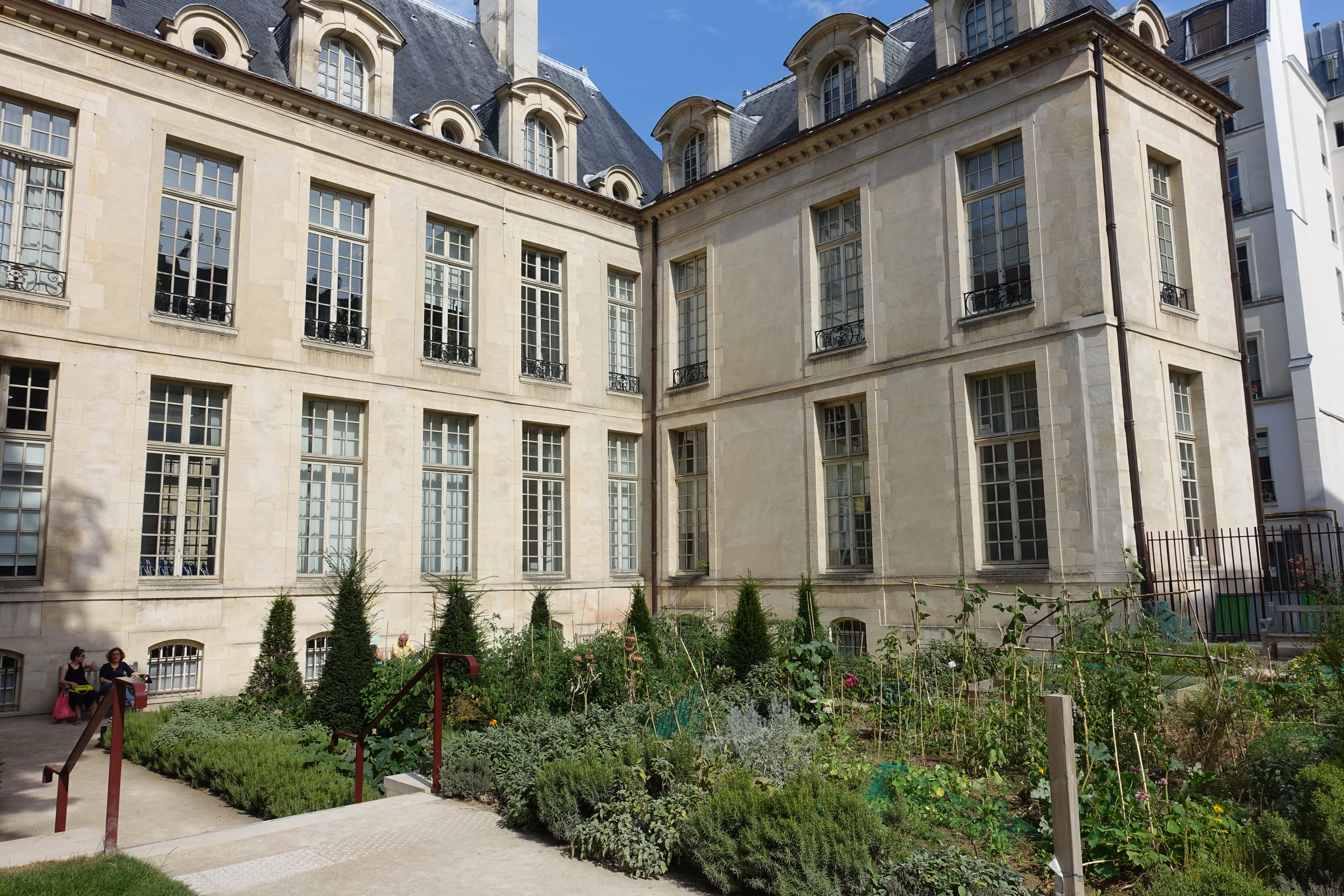

The third and final part of the garden is located behind the Hôtel d'Albret and offers a garden 'shared' between the local residents, espaliers, and highlights one of the 77 towers of the Wall of Philip II Augustus, a listed historical monument.

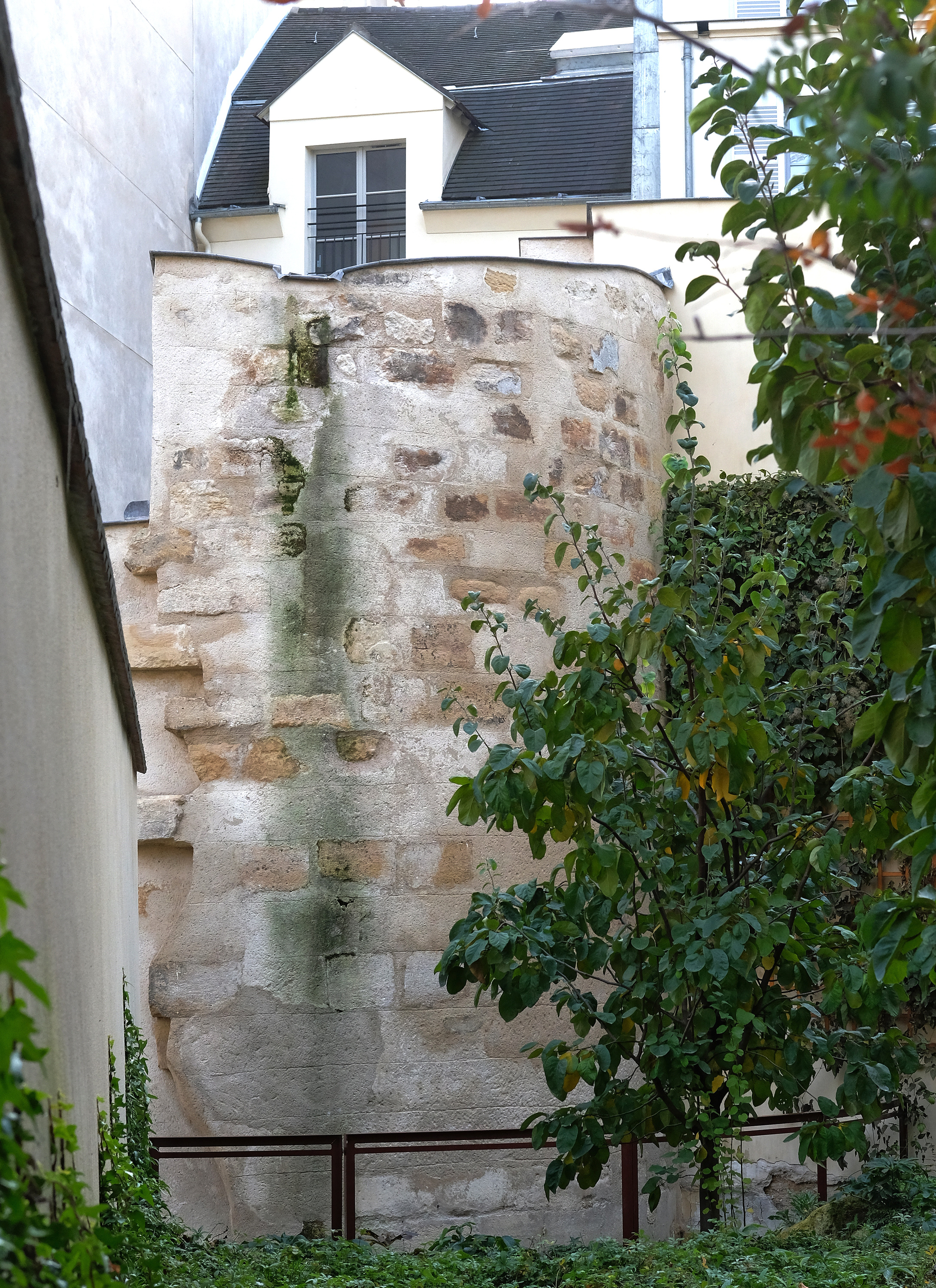

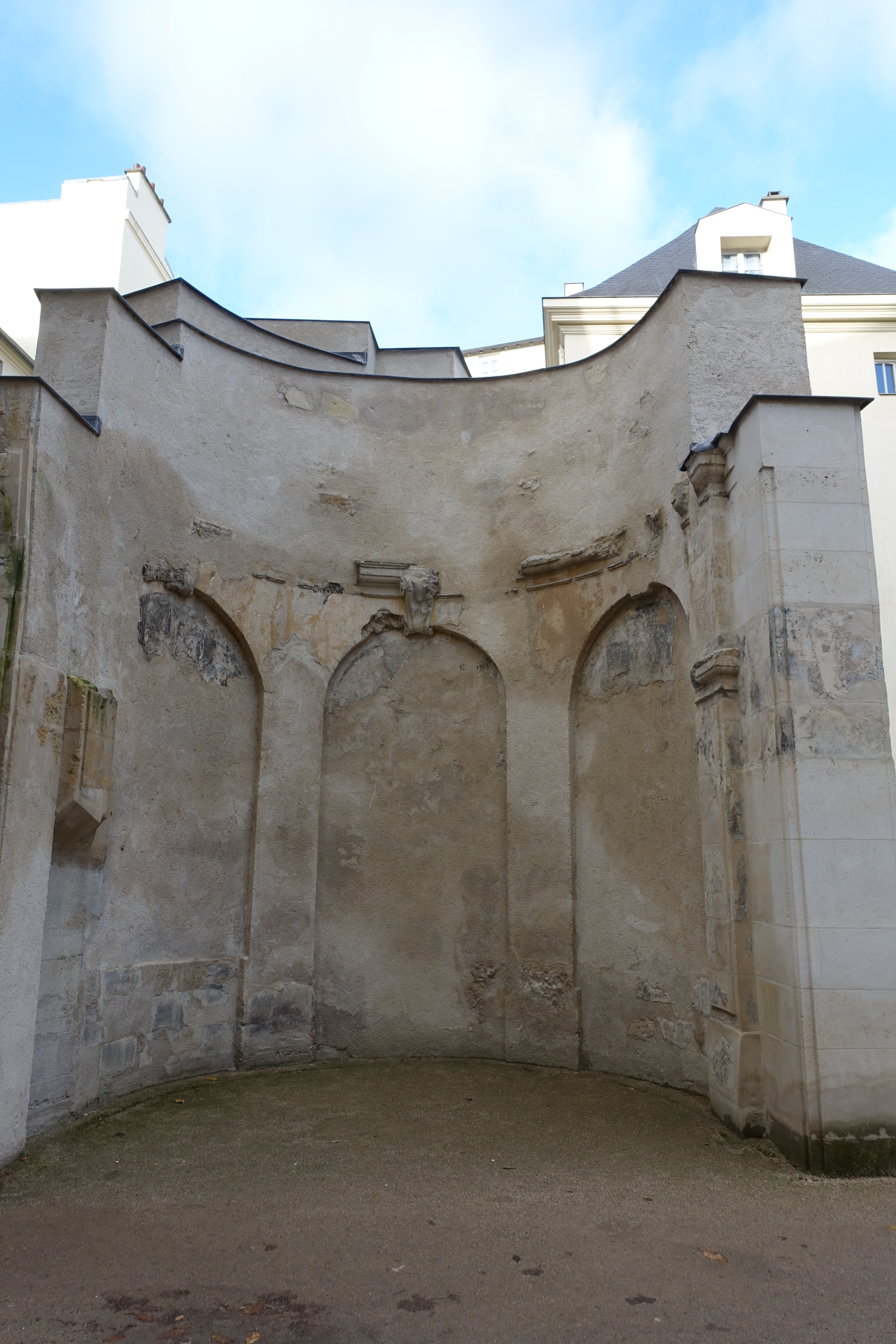

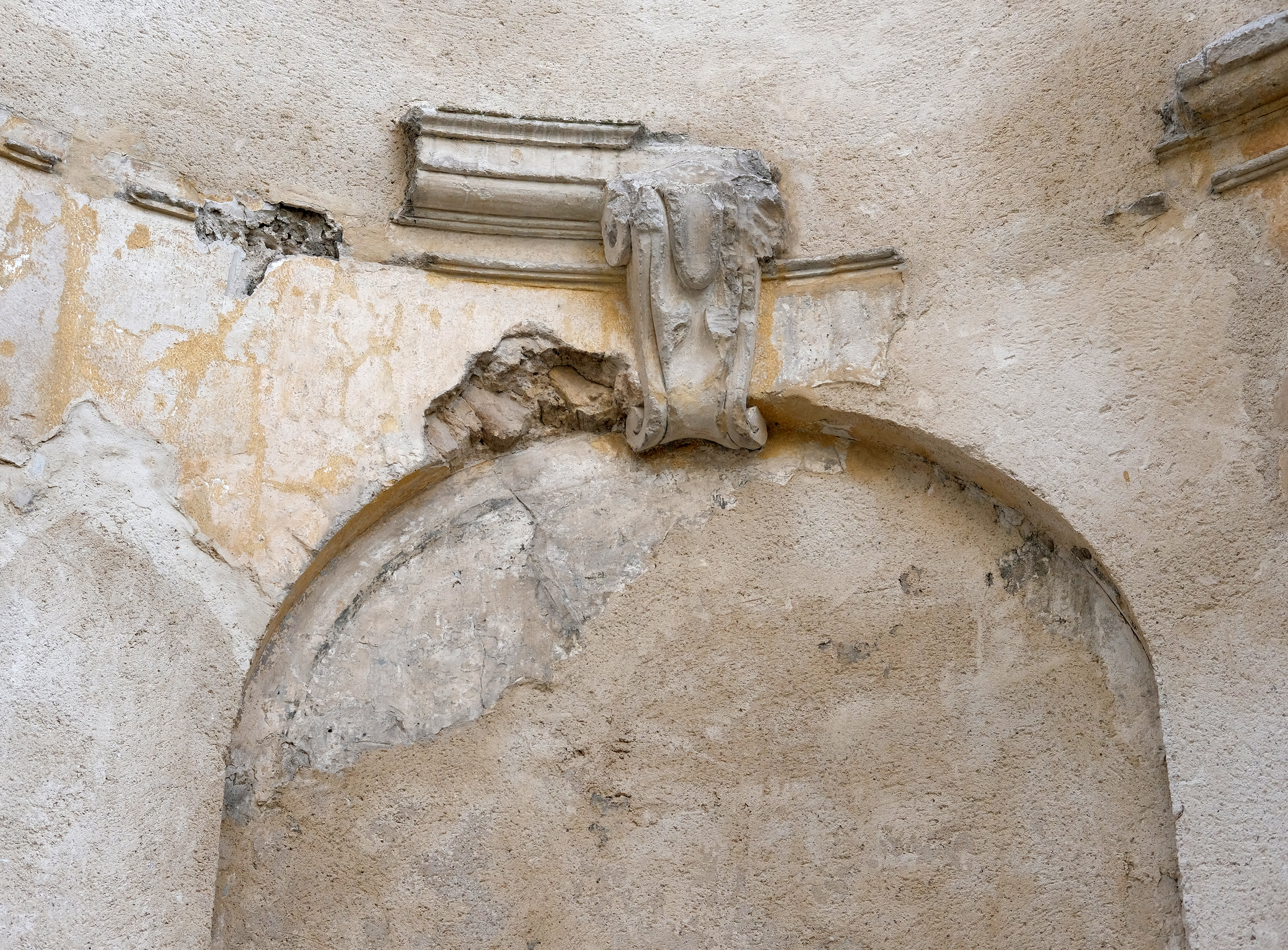

Despite its degraded condition, the tower remains very recognisable. Over the centuries, attached to the property of the Hôtel d'Albret, it served as a summer dining-room, and, later on, as a chapel.

The bustling rue des Rosiers can be reached through the third part of the garden, via a small covered walkway at number 10.

== History ==
The public garden was created in 2007 and completed in 2014.

== Annexes ==
This site is serviced by the Saint-Paul metro station.

== See also ==
- List of parks and gardens in Paris
- 4th arrondissement of Paris
- Paris
