= Hernandaline =

- Chemical structure of hernandaline

Names
- IUPAC name 4,5-Dimethoxy-2-[(1,2,10-trimethoxyaporphin-9-yl)oxy]benzaldehyde
- Systematic IUPAC name 4,5-Dimethoxy-2-{[(6aS)-1,2,10-trimethoxy-6-methyl-5,6,6a,7-tetrahydro-4H-dibenzo[de,g]quinolin-9-yl]oxy}benzaldehyde

Identifiers
CAS Number	10210-99-8
3D model (JSmol)	Interactive image
ChemSpider	68024761
PubChem CID	12310422
UNII	V29A3DB7ES
CompTox Dashboard (EPA)	DTXSID501046109
- InChI: InChI=1S/C29H31NO7/c1-30-8-7-16-10-26(35-5)29(36-6)28-19-13-23(33-3)25(11-17(19)9-20(30)27(16)28)37-21-14-24(34-4)22(32-2)12-18(21)15-31/h10-15,20H,7-9H2,1-6H3/t20-/m0/s1 Key: HLUNBGMOGGEWFX-FQEVSTJZSA-N
- SMILES: CN1CCC2=CC(=C(C3=C2[C@@H]1CC4=CC(=C(C=C43)OC)OC5=CC(=C(C=C5C=O)OC)OC)OC)OC

Properties
Chemical formula	C_{29}H_{31}NO_{7}
Molar mass	505.567 g·mol^{−1}
Melting point	170–171.5 °C (338.0–340.7 °F; 443.1–444.6 K)
- Except where otherwise noted, data are given for materials in their standard state (at 25 °C [77 °F], 100 kPa). verify (what is ?) Infobox references

Hernandaline is one of a class of quinoline alkaloids with chemical formula C29H31NO7 $\ce{C29H31NO7}$ . This compound has been isolated from the stem bark of Hernandia ovigera (Hernandiaceae). Studies have established than hernandaline has hypotensive activity. Its optical rotation is $[\alpha]_D^{20} = +36.5$°.

== See also ==
- Aporphine
