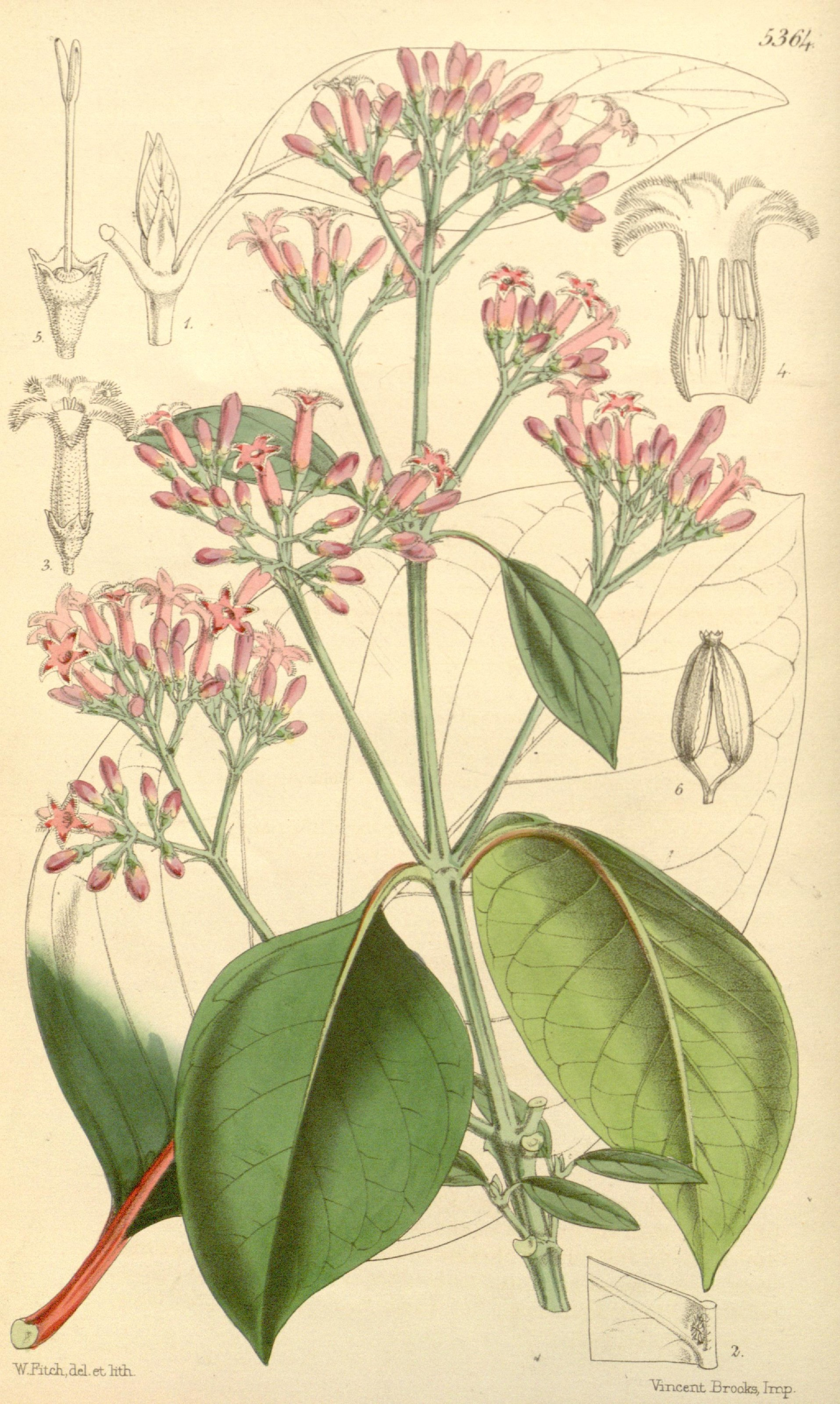

Scientific classification
- Kingdom: Plantae
- Clade: Tracheophytes
- Clade: Angiosperms
- Clade: Eudicots
- Clade: Asterids
- Order: Gentianales
- Family: Rubiaceae
- Genus: Cinchona
- Species: C. officinalis

Binomial name
- Cinchona officinalis L.

Synonyms
- List: Cascarilla officinalis (L.) Ruiz; Cinchona academica Guibourt; Cinchona chahuarguera Pav.; Cinchona coccinea Pav. ex DC.; Cinchona colorata Lamb.; Cinchona condaminea Bonpl.; Cinchona condaminea var. chahuarguera Pav. ex DC.; Cinchona condaminea var. lanceolata Wedd.; Cinchona condaminea var. vera Wedd.; Cinchona crispa Tafalla ex Howard.; Cinchona lanceolata Ruiz & Pav.; Cinchona lancifolia var. lanceolata Roem. & Schult.; Cinchona legitima Ruiz ex Lamb.; Cinchona lucumifolia var. stupea Wedd.; Cinchona macrocalyx var. obtusifolia Pavón ex DC.; Cinchona macrocalyx var. uritusinga Pav. ex DC.; Cinchona obtusifolia Pav. ex DC.; Cinchona officinalis var. bonplandiana-colorata Howard; Cinchona officinalis var. bonplandiana-lutea Howard; Cinchona officinalis var. condaminea (Bonpl.) Howard; Cinchona officinalis var. crispa (Tafalla ex Howard) Howard; Cinchona officinalis var. uritusinga (Pav. ex DC.) Howard; Cinchona palton Pav.; Cinchona peruviana Mutis; Cinchona suberosa Pav. ex Howard.; Cinchona uritusinga Pav. ex Howard; Cinchona violacea Pav. ex Howard; Cinchona weddelliana Kuntze; Hindsia subandina Krause; Quinquina officinalis (L.) Kuntze; Quinquina palton (Pav.) Kuntze

= Cinchona officinalis =

Quinine bark

Species of plant

Cinchona officinalis is a South American tree in the family Rubiaceae. It is native to wet montane forests in Colombia, Ecuador, Peru and Bolivia, between 1600–2700 meters above sea level. It is the national tree of Peru.

== Description ==
Cinchona officinalis is a shrub or tree with rugose bark and branchlets covered in minute hairs. Stipules lanceolate or oblong, acute or obtuse, glabrous. Leaves lanceolate to elliptic or ovate, usually about 10 centimetres (3.9 in). long and 3.5–4 centimetres (1.4–1.6 in). wide; acute, acuminate, or obtuse tip; base rounded to attenuate; coriaceous, glabrous above and often lustrous; glabrous beneath or puberulent or short-pilose, especially on the veins. Inflorescences in terminal panicles, many-flowered; hypanthium with short coarse hairs; reddish calyx, glabrous or nearly so, with triangular lobes; pink or red corolla, sericeous, the lobes ovate, acute, the corolla tube being about 1 cm. long. Fruit is an oblong capsule, 1.5–2 cm. long, almost glabrous.

== Vernacular names ==
English: quinine, red cinchona, cinchona bark, Jesuit’s bark, loxa bark, Jesuit’s powder, countess powder, Peruvian bark.

Spanish: quina, cascarilla, cargua cargua, corteza coja.

French: quinquina, écorce du Pérou.

== Toxicity ==
Cinchona bark and its quinine alkaloids can cause cardiac sodium and potassium channel blockade, CNS and renal toxicity. Cinchonism trio: GI upset, headaches, and tinnitus. Ventricular arrhythmias, hypoglycemia, renal failure, respiratory failure, jaundice, death

== Uses ==
Cinchona officinalis is a medicinal plant, one of several Cinchona species used for the production of quinine, which is an anti-fever agent. It was historically important in the prevention and treatment of malaria, before being superseded by synthetic and semi-synthetic antimalarial drugs, many of which are derivatives of Cinchona alkaloids. Other alkaloids that are extracted from this tree include cinchonine, cinchonidine and quinidine.
