= C29H31NO7 =

The molecular formula C_{29}H_{31}NO_{7} (molar mass: 505.56 g/mol, exact mass: 505.2101 u) may refer to:

- Hernandaline
- Rocaglamide
