= Benzindopyrine =

Clinical data
- Other names: Pyrbenzindole; Purbenzindole; Benzylindolylethylpyridine; 4-(1-Benzyl-3-indolylethyl)pyridine
- ATC code: None

Identifiers
- IUPAC name: 1-benzyl-3-(2-pyridin-4-ylethyl)indole
- CAS Number: 16571-59-8
- PubChem CID: 21770
- DrugBank: DB19669
- UNII: 21Y024X5FO
- ChEMBL: ChEMBL2110797

Chemical and physical data
- Formula: C_{22}H_{20}N_{2}
- Molar mass: 312.416 g·mol^{−1}
- 3D model (JSmol): Interactive image
- SMILES: C1=CC=C(C=C1)CN2C=C(C3=CC=CC=C32)CCC4=CC=NC=C4
- InChI: InChI=1S/C22H20N2/c1-2-6-19(7-3-1)16-24-17-20(21-8-4-5-9-22(21)24)11-10-18-12-14-23-15-13-18/h1-9,12-15,17H,10-11,16H2; Key:VRJCKJKZCZLXBK-UHFFFAOYSA-N

Benzindopyrine (INN; developmental code name IN-461), also known as pyrbenzindole or as 4-(1-benzyl-3-indolylethyl)pyridine, is a drug described as a "psychotherapeutic agent", "tranquilizer", and "ataractic" which was never marketed. It is an indole derivative and an analogue of the neurotransmitter serotonin, though it is not a tryptamine. The drug was studied in the treatment of anxiety and depression, but was found to be no more effective than placebo. It is said to have central depressant effects in humans, though infrequently producing sleepiness and instead causing insomnia. Benzindopyrine was first described in the scientific literature by 1959. Methylindolylethylpyridine (IN-399; 4-(1-methyl-3-indolylethyl)pyridine), the analogue of benzindopyrine in which the 1-benzyl group has been replaced with a 1-methyl substitution, is also known.

== See also ==
- Benanserin
- Indalpine
