= Peter Catt =

UK nurseryman and plant breeder

Peter Catt (died 29 March 2025) was a UK plant-breeder and horticulturist, specialising in woody plants.

He was educated at Chichester Grammar School, undertook the compulsory National Service and was married in 1959 to Joyce (died 2001). From leaving school he worked in shops and plant nurseries, with his father or others until 1971 when he and Peter Thorpe set up Liss Forest Nursery in Hampshire together. After this was sold in 1976 he established a business propagating trees and shrubs on a six-acre field in Greatham in collaboration with Judy Medhurst. Glasshouses were later added. Catt travelled extensively in Asia, New Zealand and the Americas seeking new plants.

He bred and introduced several new varieties to the UK including Spiraea japonica 'Golden Princess' (c. 1982), Choisya ternata, Caryopteris × clandonensis 'Stephi', and Salvia yangii (Perovskia atriplicifolia) 'Lacey Blue' among others. He chaired the Royal Horticultural Society Woody Plant trials subcommittee for many years.

He was life president of Liss Horticultural Society. He was awarded the Veitch Memorial Medal in 1998 and Victoria Medal of Honour in 2018 by the Royal Horticultural Society.

He died in 2025.
