= Rhazinilam =

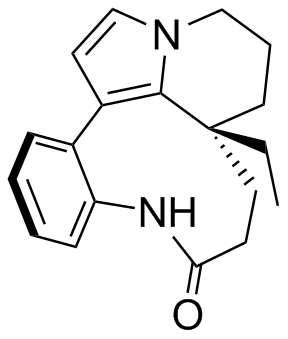

Names
- Preferred IUPAC name (3aR)-3a-Ethyl-2,3,3a,4,5,7-hexahydroindolizino[8,1-ef][1]benzazonin-6(1H)-one

Identifiers
CAS Number	36193-36-9
3D model (JSmol)	Interactive image
ChemSpider	9487402
PubChem CID	11312435
CompTox Dashboard (EPA)	DTXSID90957594
- InChI: InChI=1S/C19H22N2O/c1-2-19-10-5-12-21-13-9-15(18(19)21)14-6-3-4-7-16(14)20-17(22)8-11-19/h3-4,6-7,9,13H,2,5,8,10-12H2,1H3,(H,20,22)/t19-/m1/s1 Key: VLQAFTDOIRUYSZ-LJQANCHMSA-N; InChI=1S/C19H22N2O/c1-2-19-10-5-12-21-13-9-15(18(19)21)14-6-3-4-7-16(14)20-17(22)8-11-19/h3-4,6-7,9,13H,2,5,8,10-12H2,1H3,(H,20,22)/t19-/m1/s1 Key: VLQAFTDOIRUYSZ-LJQANCHMSA-N
- SMILES: CC[C@]12CCCN3C1=C(C=C3)C4=CC=CC=C4NC(=O)CC2

Properties
Chemical formula	C_{19}H_{22}N_{2}O
Molar mass	294.398 g·mol^{−1}
- Except where otherwise noted, data are given for materials in their standard state (at 25 °C [77 °F], 100 kPa). Infobox references

Rhazinilam is an alkaloid first isolated in 1965 by Linde from the Melodinus australis plant. It was later isolated from the shrub Rhazya stricta as well as from other organisms.

== Biological activity ==
Rhazinilam has activity similar to that of colchicine, taxol and vinblastine, acting as a spindle poison.

== Total synthesis ==
Rhazinilam was first synthesized in 1973 by Smith and coworkers, and multiple subsequent times.

=== Trauner synthesis ===
Bowie, Alfred L.; Hughes, Chambers C.; Trauner, Dirk (2005). "Concise Synthesis of (±)-Rhazinilam through Direct Coupling". Organic Letters. 7 (23): 5207–5209. doi:10.1021/ol052033v. PMID 16268539.

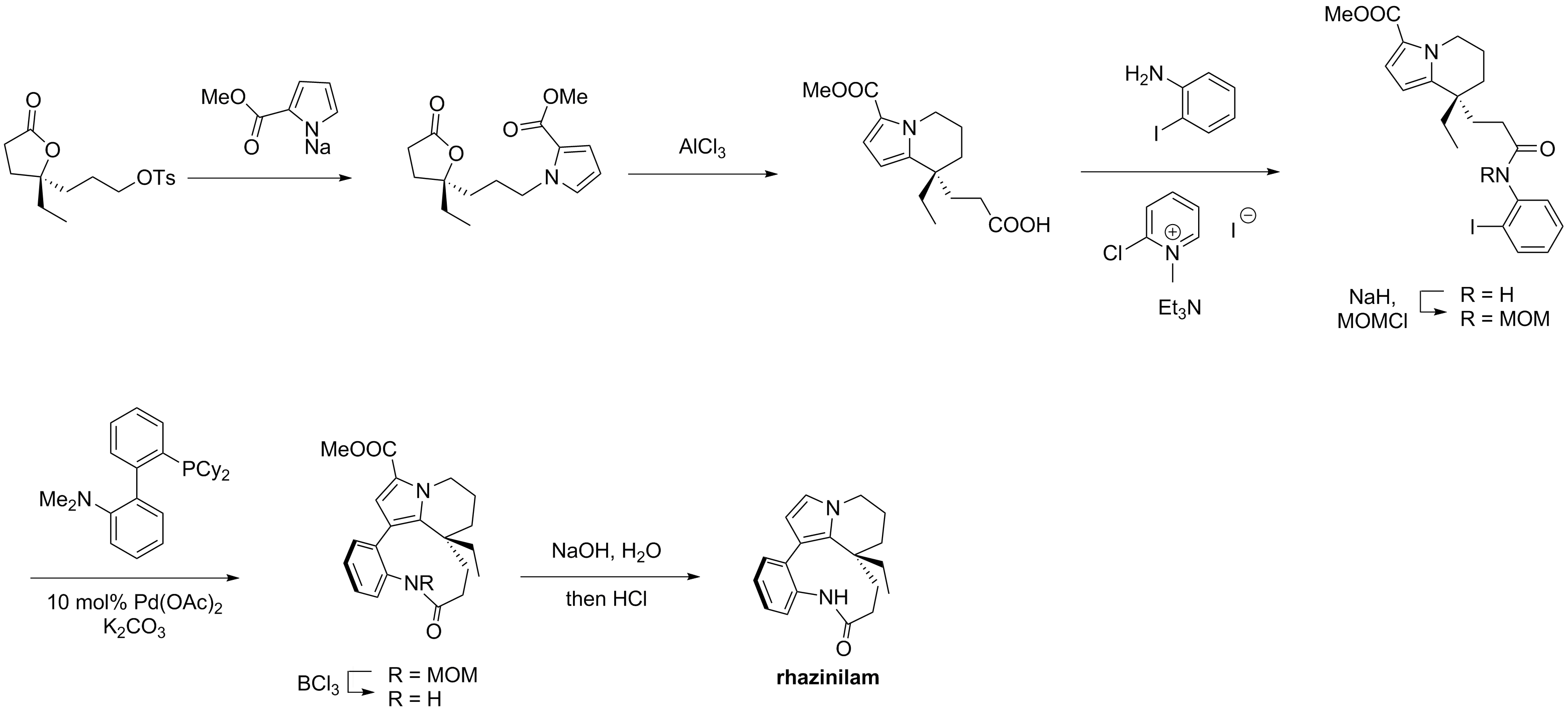
Rhazinilam – Trauner synthesis
