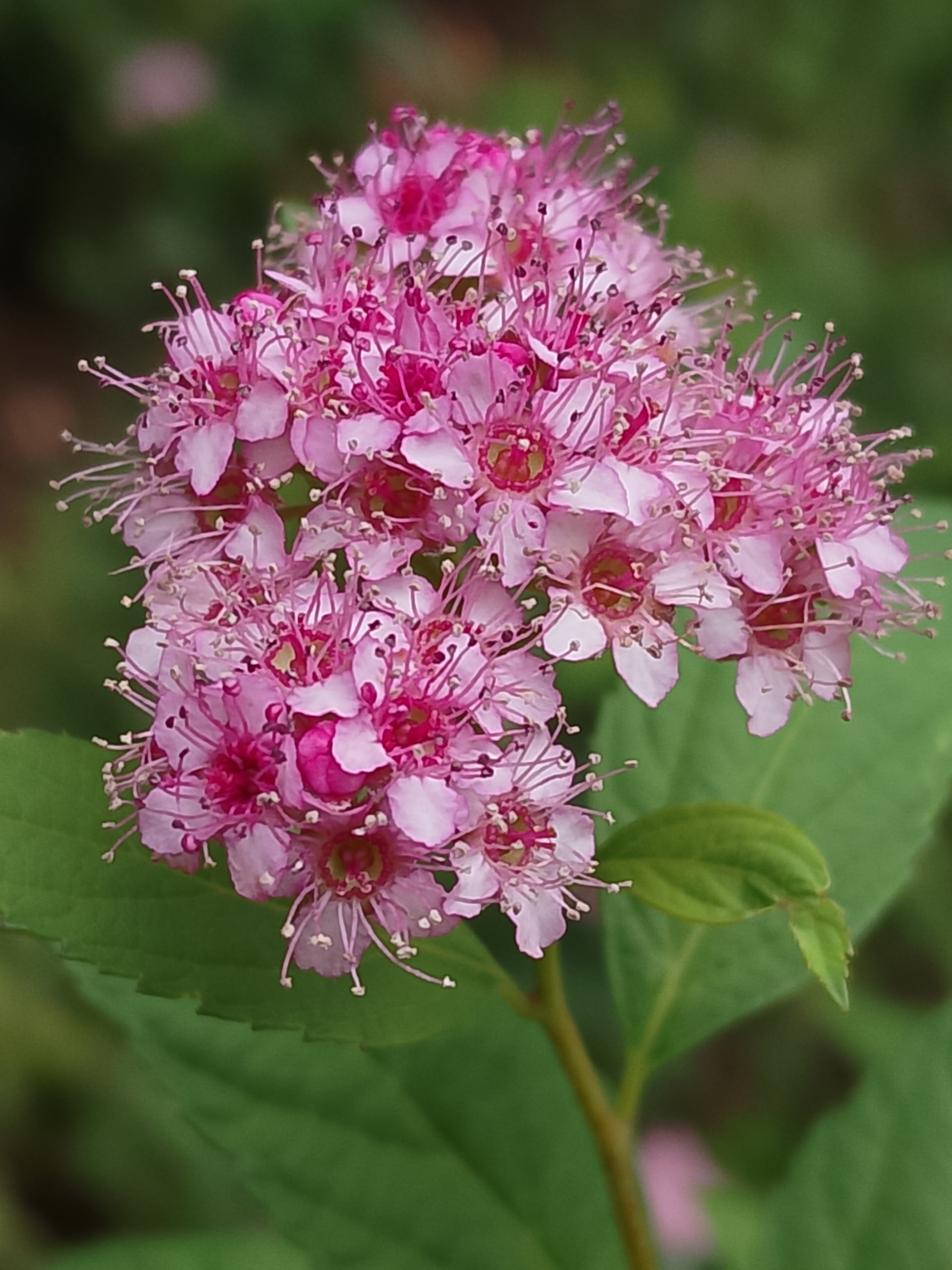
- Inflorescence

Scientific classification
- Kingdom: Plantae
- Clade: Embryophytes
- Clade: Tracheophytes
- Clade: Angiosperms
- Clade: Eudicots
- Clade: Rosids
- Order: Rosales
- Family: Rosaceae
- Genus: Spiraea
- Species: S. japonica

Binomial name
- Spiraea japonica L.f.

= Spiraea japonica =

Flowering plant in the family Rosaceae

Spiraea japonica, the Japanese meadowsweet or Japanese spiraea, is a plant in the family Rosaceae.

Synonyms for the species name are Spiraea bumalda Burv. and Spiraea japonica var. alpina Maxim.

== Description ==
Spiraea japonica is one of several Spiraea shrubs with alternate, simple leaves, on wiry, freely branching, erect stems. The stems are brown to reddish-brown, round in cross-section and sometimes hairy. The shrub reaches 1.2 m to almost 2 m in height and about the same in width. The deciduous leaves are generally an ovate shape about 2.5 cm to 7.5 cm long, have toothed margins, and alternate along the stem. Clusters of rosy-pink flowers are found at the tips of the branches. The seeds measure about 2.5 mm in length and are found in small lustrous capsules.

It is naturally variable in form and there are many varieties of it in the horticulture trade. So far, nine varieties have been described within the species.

== Distribution ==
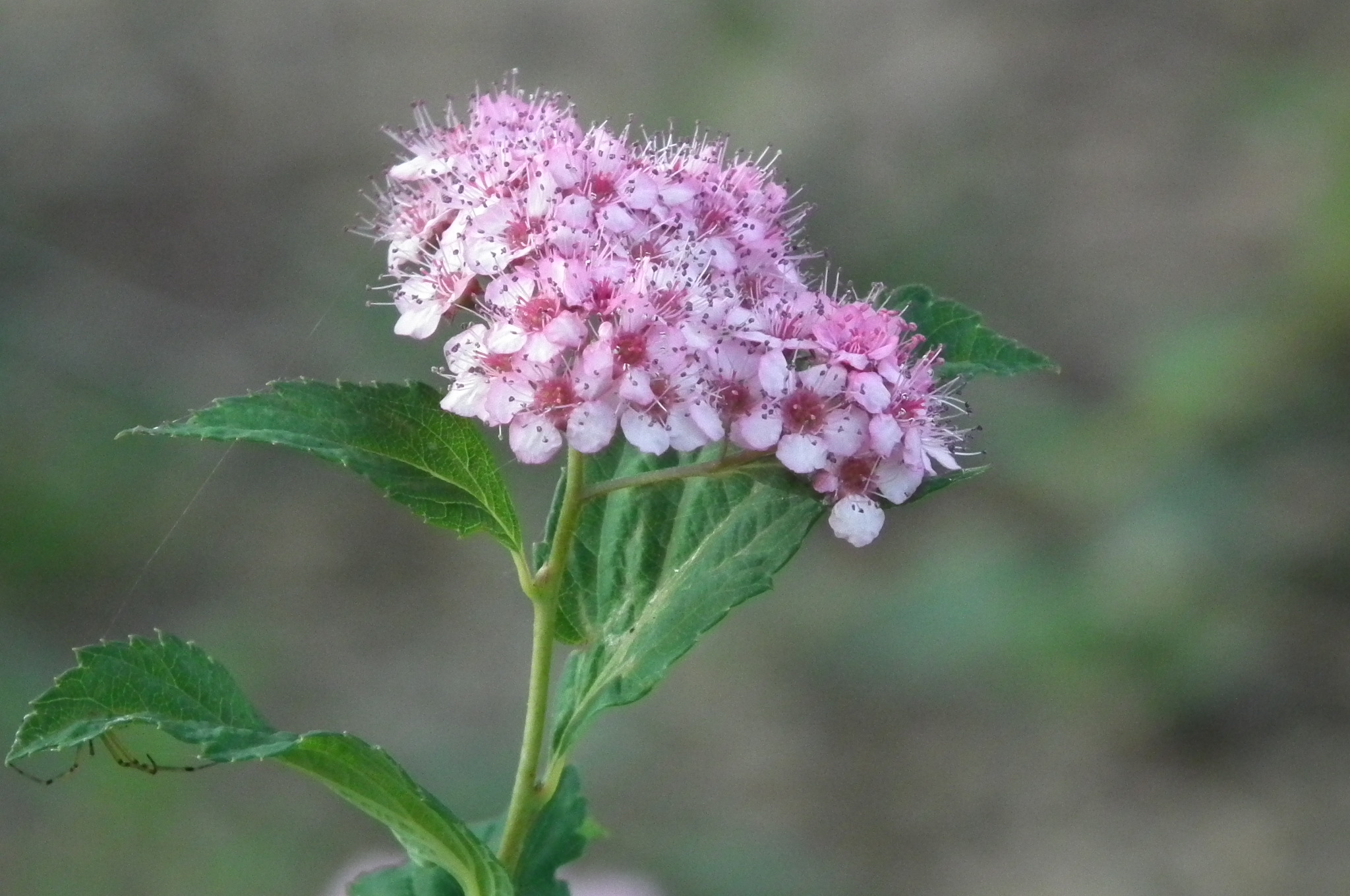
Flower of Japanese spiraea in Japan

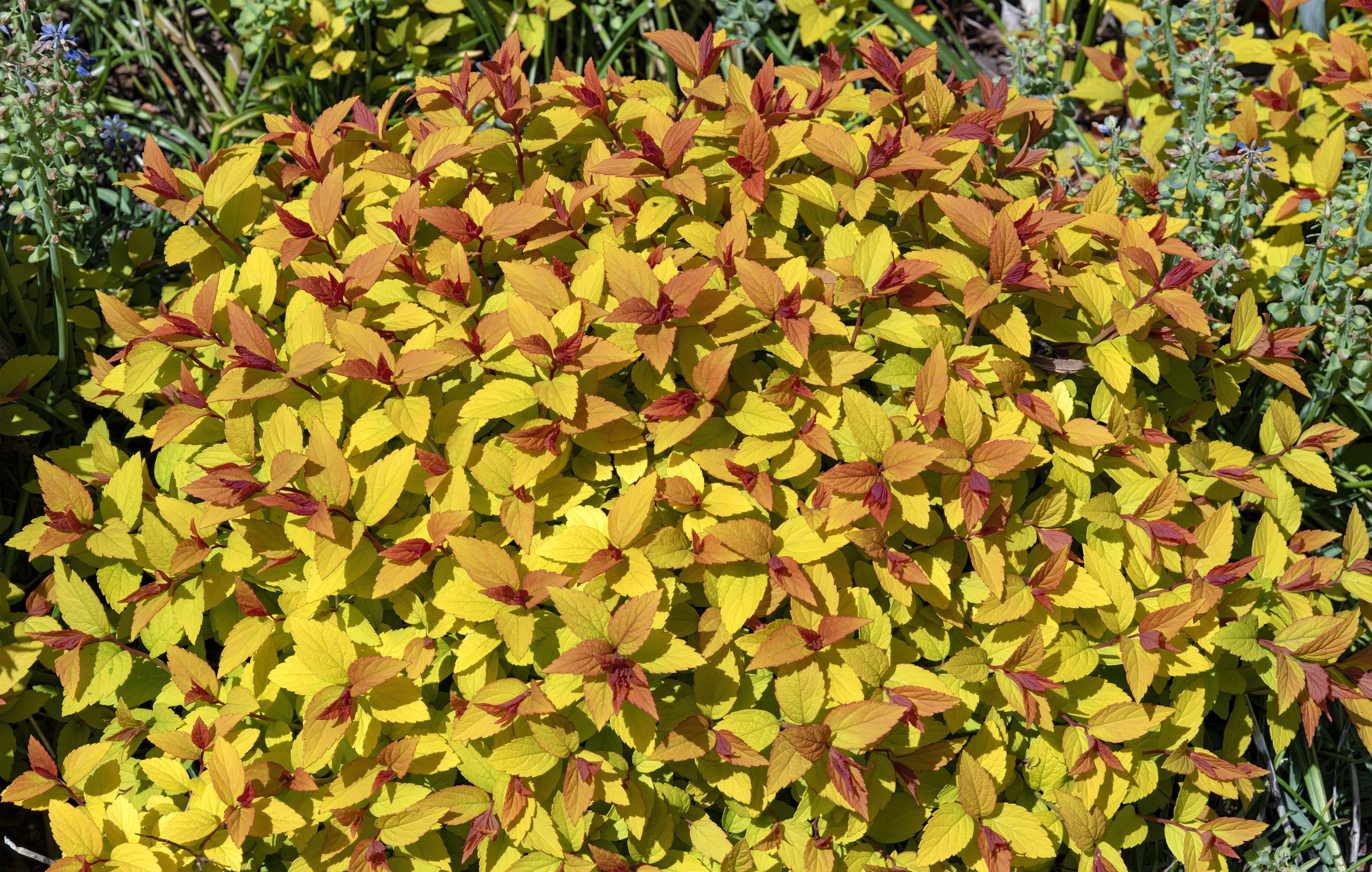
Spiraea japonica 'Goldflame' - foliage

Spiraea japonica is a deciduous, perennial shrub native to Japan, China, and Korea. Southwest China is the center for biodiversity of the species. It is naturalized throughout much of the Northeast, Southeast, and Midwest areas of the United States, and parts of Canada.

== Habitat ==
A common habitat for S. japonica in general seems to be in riparian areas, bogs, or other wetland habitats. It is found growing along streams, rivers, forest edges, roadsides, successional fields, and power line right-of-ways. It prefers full sun, but can tolerate partial shade. It prefers much water during the growing season; however, it cannot tolerate saturated soils for extended periods of time. It prefers a rich, moist loam, but it can grow in a wide variety of soils, including those on the alkaline side.

== Uses ==
Spiraea japonica was introduced in North America as an ornamental landscape plant and first cultivated in the northeastern states around 1870.

Numerous cultivars have been selected for garden use. The tall forms may be grown as hedges, low screens, or foundation shrubs. The low-growing forms can be used as groundcover or in borders. In the UK, the following cultivars have gained the Royal Horticultural Society's Award of Garden Merit:-

- 'Candlelight'
- 'Dart's Red'
- Golden Princess = ‘Lisp’ bred by Peter Catt.
- Magic Carpet = ‘Walbuma’
- 'Nana'

S. japonica has been used as traditional medicine by native people, and extracts from the plants were found to be bioactive.

== Alkaloids ==
Spiraea japonica L. fil. yields a series of closely related alkaloids, Spiradines A-G.
