= Ketipramine =

Chemical compound

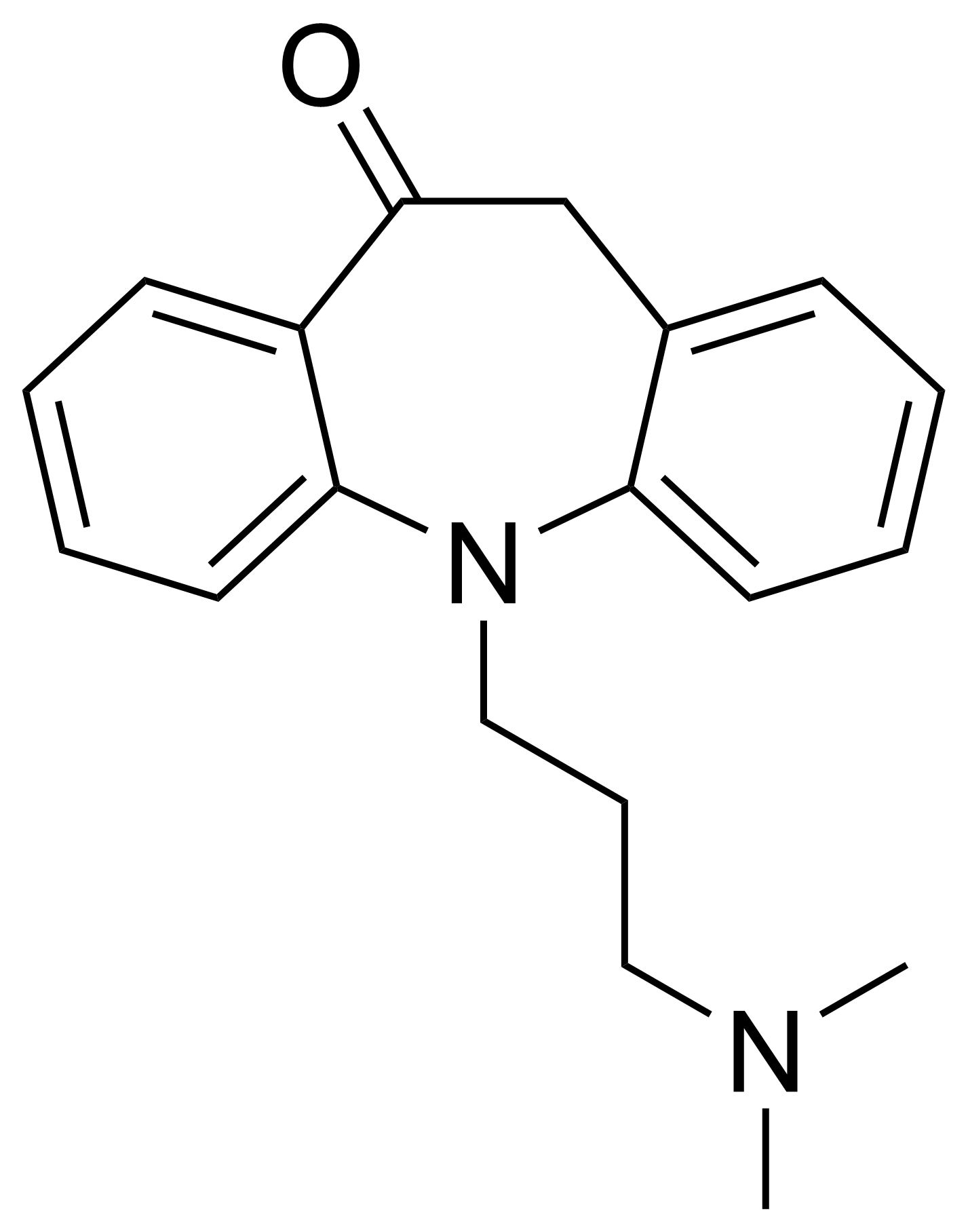

Clinical data
- Routes of administration: Oral
- ATC code: none

Identifiers
- IUPAC name: 5-[3-(dimethylamino)propyl]-5,11-dihydro-10H-dibenzo[b,f]azepin-10-one
- CAS Number: 796-29-2; Fumarate salt: 17243-32-2
- PubChem CID: 28424
- ChemSpider: 26443
- UNII: U5C4H63K5U; Fumarate salt: 86490E9X8J
- CompTox Dashboard (EPA): DTXSID60229790

Chemical and physical data
- Formula: C_{19}H_{22}N_{2}O
- Molar mass: 294.398 g·mol^{−1}
- 3D model (JSmol): Interactive image
- SMILES: O=C3c1c(cccc1)N(c2c(cccc2)C3)CCCN(C)C

Ketipramine (G-35,259), also known as ketimipramine or ketoimipramine, is a tricyclic antidepressant (TCA) that was tested in clinical trials for the treatment of depression in the 1960s but was never marketed. It differs from imipramine in terms of chemical structure only by a single ketone group, and is approximately equivalent in effectiveness as an antidepressant in comparison.

It was one of the drugs tested by Roland Kuhn in a series of unethical experiments testing drugs on children without informed consent that were done in a psychiatric hospital located in Münsterlingen, Switzerland.

== See also ==
- Tricyclic antidepressant
