= Quinoline alkaloids =

Quinoline, the parent compound of the quinoline alkaloids

Quinoline alkaloids are naturally occurring chemical compounds from the group of alkaloids, which are chemically derived from quinoline. Some quinoline alkaloids show antiseptic, convulsive or antineoplastic effects.

== Examples ==
Alkaloids with a quinoline partial structure are widespread and are usually further subdivided according to their occurrence and biogenetic origin. Among the quinoline alkaloids are the cinchona alkaloids quinine and quinidine, which are important due to their therapeutic potential, furthermore cinchonine and cinchonidine, as well as some furoquinoline alkaloids and acridine alkaloids. Strychnine and brucine, alkaloids of the nux vomica, which have a hydrogenated quinoline system, are also counted among the quinoline alkaloids. Also nitramarine (1-(2-quinolinyl)-β-carboline) belongs to the quinoline alkaloids.

Quinine

Cinchonidine

Cinchonine

Quinidine

Strychnine

== Occurrence ==
The quinoline alkaloids are mainly found in plants, as in Rutaceae and Rubiaceae, but also in microorganisms and animals. Quinoline is furthermore comprised as a partial structure in the redox factor PQQ (pyrroloquinoline quinone) and in quinoenzymes.

== Biosynthesis ==
Biogenetically, there are several proven pathways for the formation of the quinoline system in plants. Tryptophane as well as anthranilic acid can act as a precursor. The second precursor molecule is either a hemiterpene or a monoterpene (e.g. secologanine in cinchona alkaloids).

== Literature ==
- Entry on Chinolin-Alkaloide. at: Römpp Online. Georg Thieme Verlag, retrieved 26. Juni 2014.
