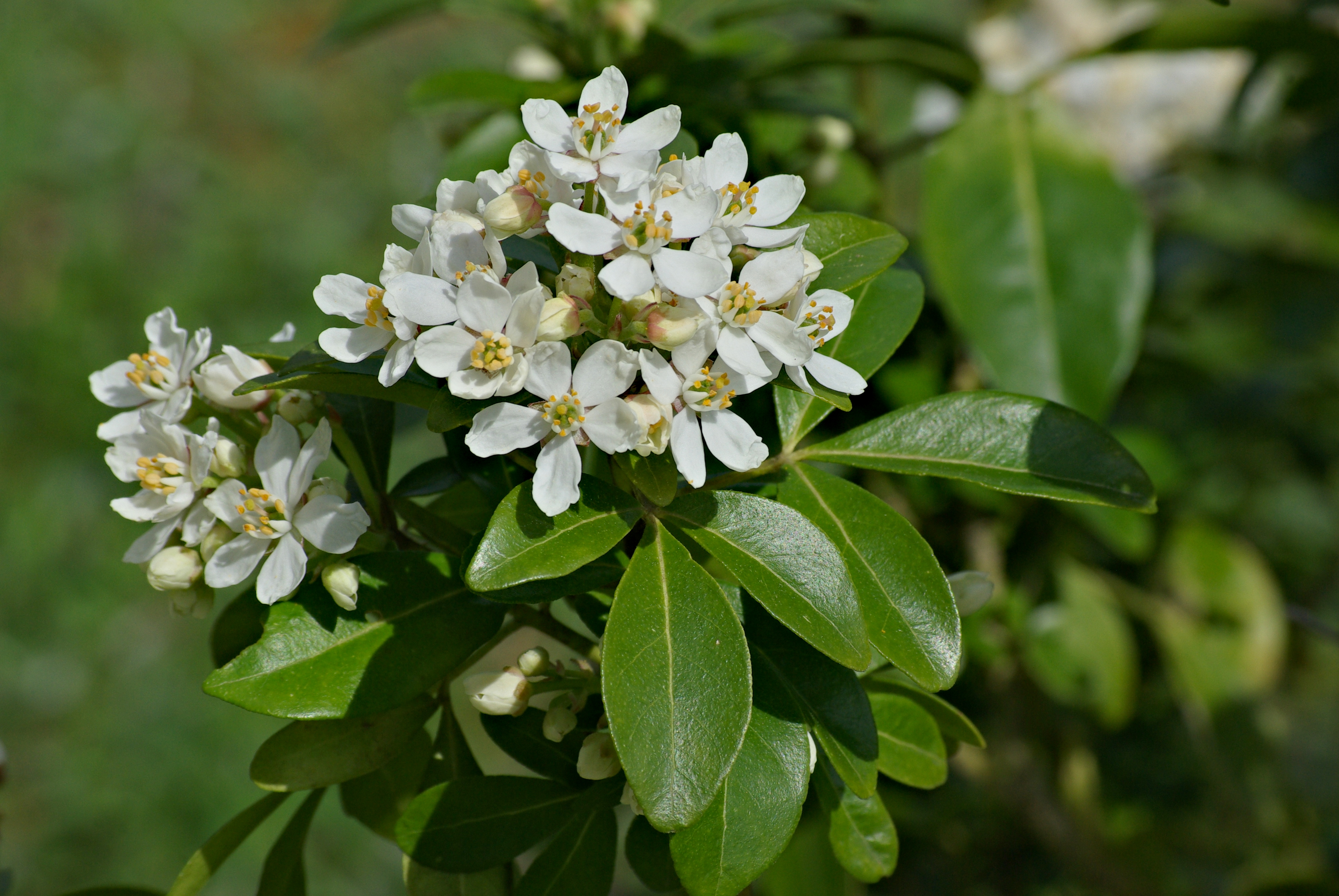

Scientific classification
- Kingdom: Plantae
- Clade: Tracheophytes
- Clade: Angiosperms
- Clade: Eudicots
- Clade: Rosids
- Order: Sapindales
- Family: Rutaceae
- Genus: Choisya
- Species: C. ternata

Binomial name
- Choisya ternata Kunth

Synonyms
- Choisya grandiflora Regel; Juliania caryophillata La Llave & Lex.

= Choisya ternata =

Species of flowering plant

Inflorescence

Choisya ternata is a species of flowering plant in the family Rutaceae, known as Mexican orange blossom or Mexican orange.

== Description ==
Choisya ternata is an evergreen shrub, growing up to 3 m (10 ft) in height. Its leaves have three leaflets (hence ternata) and are aromatic, releasing a smell reminiscent of basil when crushed. The white flowers are scented, appearing in spring (sometimes with limited repeat flowering in autumn).

== Distribution and habitat ==
Choisya ternata originates from Mexico. It is drought tolerant, preferring well drained soils.

== Cultivation ==
Foliage of Choisya 'Aztec Pearl'

Choisya ternata is widely grown as an ornamental shrub in suitable climates. It tolerates temperatures down to −10 °C (14 °F) but is severely damaged by temperatures lower than −15 °C (5 °F). It responds well to pruning and shaping.

In addition to the species, a number of cultivars are grown, including the golden-leaved C. ternata 'Lich' (usually sold under the name Sundance), and the inter-specific hybrid C. 'Aztec Pearl' (C. dumosa var. arizonica × C. ternata). The species and these two cultivars have gained the Royal Horticultural Society's Award of Garden Merit.

== Phytochemistry ==
Many quinoline alkaloids have been isolated from leaves of C. ternata. C. ternata contains an alkaloid (ternanthranin), a volatile simple anthranilate, that was shown to have pain-killing effects in mice.
