= Benanserin =

Clinical data
- Other names: Benanserine; MC-4788; Sq-4788; Benzyl antiserotonin; Benzylantiserotonin; BAS; Serotonin benzyl analogue; Wooley's antiserotonin; 1-Benzyl-2-methyl-5-methoxytryptamine
- Routes of administration: Oral, intravenous injection
- Drug class: Serotonin receptor antagonist; Tranquilizer

Identifiers
- IUPAC name: 2-(1-benzyl-5-methoxy-2-methylindol-3-yl)ethanamine
- CAS Number: 441-91-8
- PubChem CID: 9925
- ChemSpider: 9537
- UNII: 9G5WZ7RO2D
- ChEMBL: ChEMBL1740857
- CompTox Dashboard (EPA): DTXSID40196037

Chemical and physical data
- Formula: C_{19}H_{22}N_{2}O
- Molar mass: 294.398 g·mol^{−1}
- 3D model (JSmol): Interactive image
- SMILES: CC1=C(C2=C(N1CC3=CC=CC=C3)C=CC(=C2)OC)CCN
- InChI: InChI=1S/C19H22N2O/c1-14-17(10-11-20)18-12-16(22-2)8-9-19(18)21(14)13-15-6-4-3-5-7-15/h3-9,12H,10-11,13,20H2,1-2H3; Key:RPSOLZRELOLSFM-UHFFFAOYSA-N

Benanserin, also known as benzyl antiserotonin (BAS), by its developmental code name MC-4788 or Sq-4788, and by its chemical name 1-benzyl-2-methyl-5-methoxytryptamine, is a serotonin receptor antagonist and described tranquilizer of the tryptamine and 5-methoxytryptamine families. It is the derivative of 5-methoxytryptamine with a benzyl group at the 1 position and a methyl group at the 2 position. The drug is said to be active in humans at a dose of 10 to 35 mg orally or intravenously. In contrast to certain other serotonin receptor antagonists like chlorpromazine, benanserin does not antagonize the subjective effects of the serotonergic psychedelic LSD. It was first described in the scientific literature by at least 1955 and was one of the first serotonin antagonists.

== See also ==
- Substituted tryptamine
- Benzindopyrine
