= Normacusine B =

Names
- IUPAC name [(15Z)-15-ethylidene-3,17-diazapentacyclo[12.3.1.0^{2,10}.0^{4,9}.0^{12,17}]octadeca-2(10),4,6,8-tetraen-13-yl]methanol
- Other names Vellosiminol; Tombozine; Sarpagan-17-ol

Identifiers
| CAS Number | 604-99-9 |
| 3D model (JSmol) | Interactive image |
| ChemSpider | 4477307 |
| PubChem CID | 5318845 |
| UNII | 8RD788YSD2 |
- InChI: InChI=1S/C19H22N2O/c1-2-11-9-21-17-8-14-12-5-3-4-6-16(12)20-19(14)18(21)7-13(11)15(17)10-22/h2-6,13,15,17-18,20,22H,7-10H2,1H3/b11-2+ Key: VXTDUGOBAOLMED-BIIKFXOESA-N
- SMILES: C/C=C/1\CN2C3CC1C(C2CC4=C3NC5=CC=CC=C45)CO

Properties
| Chemical formula | C_{19}H_{22}N_{2}O |
| Molar mass | 294.398 g·mol^{−1} |
- Except where otherwise noted, data are given for materials in their standard state (at 25 °C [77 °F], 100 kPa). Infobox references

Normacusine B (vellosiminol) is a hypotensive isolate of Strychnos atlantica.
