= Cinchonine =

- Cinchonine

Names
- IUPAC name (9S)-Cinchonan-9-ol
- Systematic IUPAC name (S)-[(2R,4S,5R)-5-Ethenyl-1-azabicyclo[2.2.2]octan-2-yl](quinolin-4-yl)methanol

Identifiers
CAS Number	118-10-5
3D model (JSmol)	Interactive image
Beilstein Reference	89689
ChEBI	CHEBI:27509
ChEMBL	ChEMBL496893
ChemSpider	746392
ECHA InfoCard	100.003.850
EC Number	204-234-6
KEGG	C06528
PubChem CID	90454
UNII	V43X79NZCD
CompTox Dashboard (EPA)	DTXSID6045082
- InChI: InChI=1S/C19H22N2O/c1-2-13-12-21-10-8-14(13)11-18(21)19(22)16-7-9-20-17-6-4-3-5-15(16)17/h2-7,9,13-14,18-19,22H,1,8,10-12H2/t13-,14-,18-,19-/m0/s1 Key: KMPWYEUPVWOPIM-LSOMNZGLSA-N; InChI=1/C19H22N2O/c1-2-13-12-21-10-8-14(13)11-18(21)19(22)16-7-9-20-17-6-4-3-5-15(16)17/h2-7,9,13-14,18-19,22H,1,8,10-12H2/t13-,14-,18-,19-/m0/s1 Key: KMPWYEUPVWOPIM-LSOMNZGLBY
- SMILES: O[C@H]([C@H]1C[C@@H]2CC[N@]1C[C@@H]2C=C)c1ccnc2ccccc12

Properties
Chemical formula	C_{19}H_{22}N_{2}O
Molar mass	294.39 g/mol
Melting point	260-263

Hazards
- GHS labelling
Pictograms	(GHS07: Exclamation mark)
Signal word	Warning
Hazard statements	H302, H317, H332
Precautionary statements	P261, P264, P270, P271, P272, P280, P301+P312, P302+P352, P304+P312, P304+P340, P312, P321, P330, P333+P313, P363, P501
- Except where otherwise noted, data are given for materials in their standard state (at 25 °C [77 °F], 100 kPa). verify (what is ?) Infobox references

Cinchonine is an alkaloid found in Cinchona officinalis. It is used in asymmetric synthesis in organic chemistry. It is a stereoisomer and pseudo-enantiomer of cinchonidine. It was first extracted from cinchona bark by the Portuguese physician Gomez in 1812. Liebig in 1830 made an elemental analysis and found C_{20}H_{22}N_{2}O, close to the correct value of C_{19}H_{22}N_{2}O

It is structurally similar to quinine, an antimalarial drug.

It is a GLP-1 receptor agonist and therefore has potential as a possible treatment for obesity, type 2 diabetes, and metabolic dysfunction–associated steatotic liver disease.
