= Cinchonidine =

- Cinchonidine

Names
- IUPAC name (9R)-8α-Cinchonan-9-ol
- Systematic IUPAC name (R)-[(2S,4S,5R)-5-Ethenyl-1-azabicyclo[2.2.2]octan-2-yl](quinolin-4-yl)methanol

Identifiers
CAS Number	485-71-2
3D model (JSmol)	Interactive image
Beilstein Reference	89690
ChEBI	CHEBI:3703
ChEMBL	ChEMBL533841
ChemSpider	91930
ECHA InfoCard	100.006.930
EC Number	207-622-3
KEGG	C11379
PubChem CID	101744
UNII	1U622LRA8Z
CompTox Dashboard (EPA)	DTXSID60883396
- InChI: InChI=1S/C19H22N2O/c1-2-13-12-21-10-8-14(13)11-18(21)19(22)16-7-9-20-17-6-4-3-5-15(16)17/h2-7,9,13-14,18-19,22H,1,8,10-12H2/t13-,14-,18-,19+/m0/s1 Key: KMPWYEUPVWOPIM-KODHJQJWSA-N; InChI=1/C19H22N2O/c1-2-13-12-21-10-8-14(13)11-18(21)19(22)16-7-9-20-17-6-4-3-5-15(16)17/h2-7,9,13-14,18-19,22H,1,8,10-12H2/t13-,14-,18-,19+/m0/s1 Key: KMPWYEUPVWOPIM-KODHJQJWBQ
- SMILES: n2c1c(cccc1)c(cc2)[C@@H](O)[C@H]3N4CC[C@@H](C3)[C@@H](C=C)C4

Properties
Chemical formula	C_{19}H_{22}N_{2}O
Molar mass	294.43 g/mol
Density	1.2 g/mL
Melting point	204 to 205 °C (399 to 401 °F; 477 to 478 K)
Boiling point	464.5 °C (868.1 °F; 737.6 K)
Solubility in water	slightly soluble 0,25 g·l^{−1} (20 °C)

Hazards
- GHS labelling
Pictograms	(GHS07: Exclamation mark) (GHS08: Health hazard)
Signal word	Warning
Hazard statements	H302, H317, H361, H373
Precautionary statements	P201, P202, P260, P264, P270, P272, P280, P281, P301+P312, P302+P352, P308+P313, P314, P321, P330, P333+P313, P363, P405, P501
- Except where otherwise noted, data are given for materials in their standard state (at 25 °C [77 °F], 100 kPa). verify (what is ?) Infobox references

Cinchonidine is an alkaloid found in Cinchona officinalis and Gongronema latifolium. It is used in asymmetric synthesis in organic chemistry.

== See also ==
- Cinchonine, a stereoisomer
